= 12th Anti-Aircraft Division =

- Formation sign of the 12th Anti-Aircraft Division.
- Active: 15 November 1940 – 30 September 1942
- Country: United Kingdom
- Branch: British Army
- Type: Anti-Aircraft Division
- Role: Air Defence
- Size: 3–5 Brigades
- Part of: III AA Corps
- Garrison/HQ: Glasgow
- Engagements: Clydebank Blitz; Belfast Blitz

12th Anti-Aircraft Division (12th AA Division) was an air defence formation of the British Army during the early years of the Second World War. It defended Western Scotland and Northern Ireland, including the period of the Clydebank Blitz and Belfast Blitz, but only had a short career.

== Mobilisation ==
The 12th Anti-Aircraft Division was one of five new divisions created on 1 November 1940 by Anti-Aircraft Command to control the expanding anti-aircraft (AA) defences of the United Kingdom. The division was formed by separating responsibility for Western Scotland (particularly the industrial areas of Clydeside and Ayrshire) and Northern Ireland from the existing 3rd AA Division, which continued to be responsible for the rest of mainland Scotland.

The divisional headquarters (HQ) was at Glasgow and the General Officer Commanding (GOC), appointed on 15 November 1940, was Major-General Gerald Rickards, promoted from command of 44th AA Brigade. The 12th AA Division formed part of III AA Corps.

== The Blitz ==
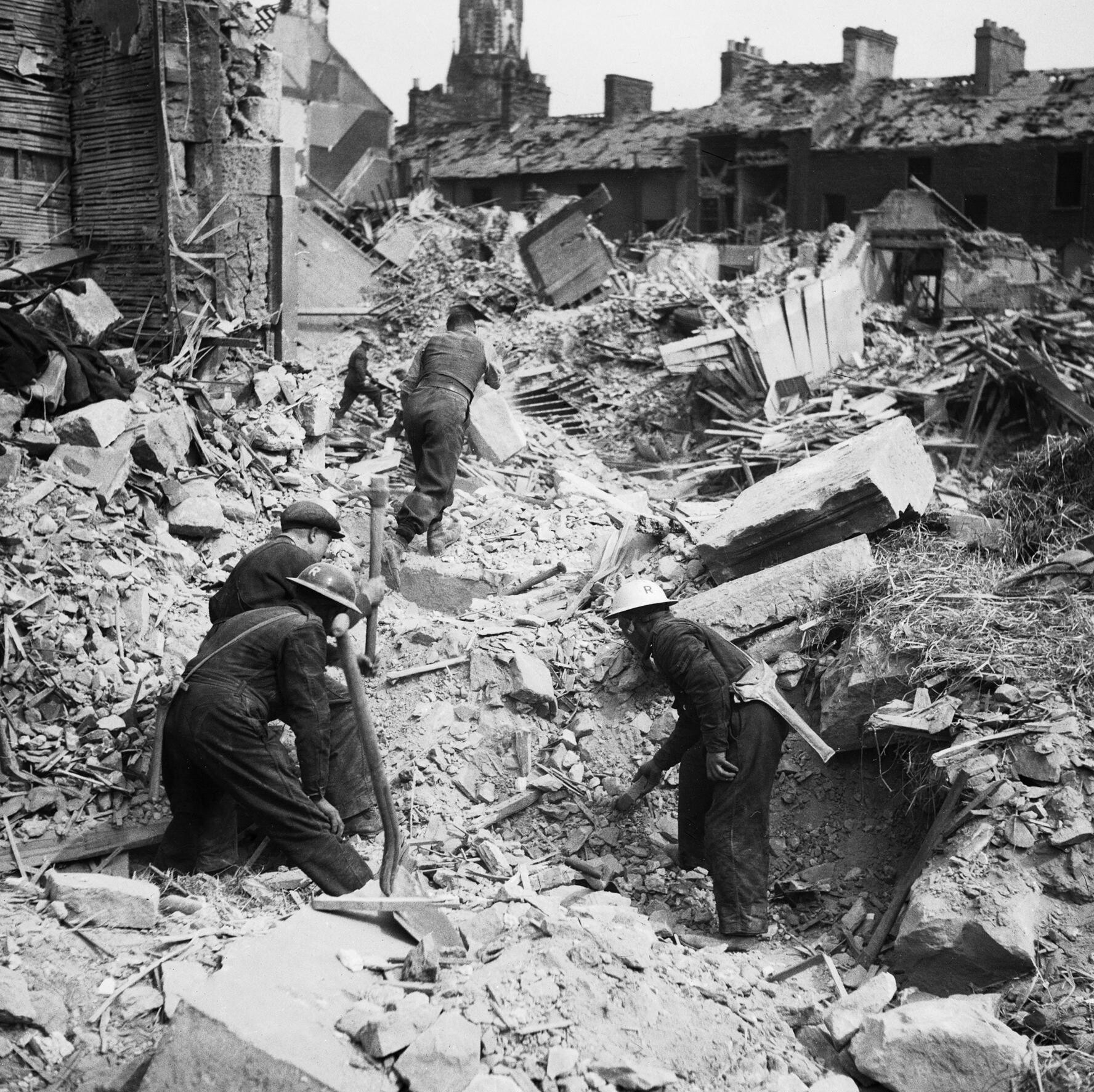
Rescue workers searching through rubble after an air raid on Belfast

The division's fighting units, organised into three AA Brigades, consisted of Heavy (HAA) and Light (LAA) gun regiments and Searchlight (S/L) regiments of the Royal Artillery (RA). The HAA guns were concentrated in the Gun Defence Areas (GDAs) at Belfast and Glasgow, LAA units were distributed to defend Vulnerable Points (VPs) such as factories and airfields, while the S/L detachments were disposed in clusters of three, spaced 10,400 yards apart.

The approved scale of HAA guns for the Clyde had been 80 in 1939, and this was raised to 120 in 1940 and again to 144 in March 1941, but by the end of February 1941, the 12th AA Division still only had 67 guns in place, rising to 88 (11 batteries) in late March.

Glasgow and Clydeside received heavy raids on the nights of 13 and 14 March 1941 (the Clydebank Blitz), and again on 7 April, while Belfast was hit on 15 April and 4 May. The Luftwaffe returned to Clydeside on 5 and 6 May, before The Blitz petered out in mid-May.

=== Order of Battle 1940–41 ===
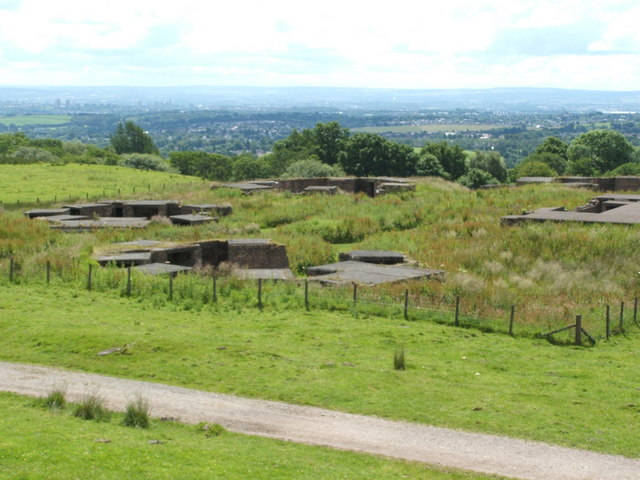
The remains of HAA gunsite N9 overlooking Clydebank.

The division's composition during the Blitz was as follows:

- 3rd AA Brigade – Northern Ireland District
  - 102nd HAA Regiment
  - 66th LAA Rgt – new unit raised December 1940 from LAA batteries of 102nd HAA Rgt
  - 90th S/L Rgt – new unit raised March 1941
  - 91st S/L Rgt – new unit raised March 1941
- 42nd AA Brigade – Clyde Estuary
  - 83rd (Blythswood) HAA Rgt
  - 100th HAA Rgt
  - 111th HAA Rgt – new unit raised October 1940
  - 123rd HAA Rgt – new unit raised February 1941
  - 18th LAA Rgt
  - 60th LAA Rgt – new unit raised November 1940; to the 63rd AA Brigade by May 1941
- 63rd AA Brigade – West Scotland
  - 60th LAA Rgt – from 42 AA Bde by May 1941
  - 56th (Cameronians) S/L Rgt – to 3rd AA Division by February 1941
  - 57th (Cameronians) S/L Rgt
  - 66th S/L Rgt– to the 8th AA Division by May 1941
  - 86th S/L Rgt – new unit raised January 1941
  - 11th AA 'Z' Regiment – divisional Z Battery rocket unit formed January 1941
- 12th AA Divisional Signals, Royal Corps of Signals (RCS) – expanded from a Glasgow company of 3rd AA Divisional Signals
- 12th Divisional Royal Army Service Corps (RASC)
  - 195th Company (Northern Ireland District)
  - 909th Company
- 12th AA Divisional Royal Army Medical Corps (RAMC)
- 12th AA Divisional Workshop Company, Royal Army Ordnance Corps (RAOC)

== Mid-War ==
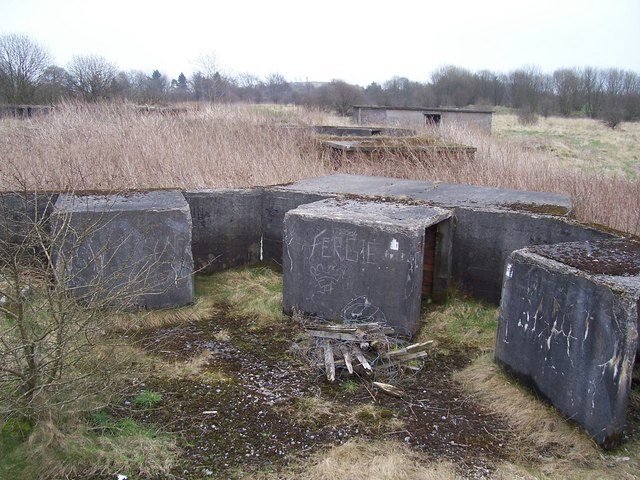
The remains of Drumcross HAA gunsite, built near Glasgow in 1941.

Newly formed AA units joined the division, the HAA and support units increasingly becoming 'Mixed' units, indicating that women of the Auxiliary Territorial Service (ATS) were fully integrated into them. At the same time, experienced units were posted away to train for service overseas; in some cases they joined the 12th AA Division temporarily while they trained in Scotland; others remained with AA Command as unbrigaded units. This led to a continual turnover of units, which accelerated in 1942 with the preparations for the invasion of North Africa (Operation Torch) and the need to transfer AA units to counter the Baedeker raids.

At the end of 1941 S/Ls were declustered to form 'killer zones' for night fighters, and the S/L requirement for Northern Ireland was reduced to three batteries. As a result, 91st S/L Rgt could be converted into an LAA Rgt for the field army.

In May 1942, the 57th AA Brigade HQ was transferred to the 12th AA Division from the 7th AA Division; some units from the 42nd AA Brigade were transferred to it, together with newly formed units. In August, to deal with the Luftwaffe's hit-and-run attacks, the 3rd AA Division's HQ was moved from Scotland to the South Coast of England and the 12th AA Division took over command of 51st AA Brigade and its units.

=== Order of Battle 1941–42 ===
During this period the division was composed as follows (temporary attachments omitted):

- 3rd AA Brigade
  - 1 HAA Rgt from 4th AA Division July 1941
  - 102nd HAA Rgt – to 6th AA Division by October 1942
  - 111th HAA Rgt – from 42 AA Bde June 1941
  - 66th LAA Rgt – to 6th AA Division June 1942
  - 81st LAA Rgt – from 42 AA Bde by October 1942
  - 84th LAA Rgt – from 63 AA Bde June 1942; to 9th AA Division by October 1942
  - 90th S/L Rgt
  - 91st S/L Rgt – converted into 114th LAA Rgt January 1942; then to 4th AA Division
- 42nd AA Brigade
  - 59th (Essex Regiment) HAA Rgt – from 6th AA Division Summer 1941; returned by December 1941
  - 60th (City of London) HAA Rgt – from 11th AA Division by December 1941; to 57 AA Bde May 1942
  - 73rd HAA Rgt – from 7th AA Division May 1941; to War Office (WO) Reserve September 1941; later to Middle East Forces (MEF)
  - 83rd (Blythswood) HAA Rgt – to WO Reserve June 1941; later to Tenth Army in Iraq
  - 100th HAA Rgt – to 57 AA Bde May 1942
  - 111th HAA Rgt – to 3 AA Bde June 1941
  - 123rd HAA Rgt – to 7th AA Division by December 1941
  - 126th HAA Rgt – new unit raised July 1941; to 9th AA Division September 1942
  - 130th (Mixed) HAA Rgt – new unit raised August 1941
  - 147th HAA Rgt– from 51 AA Bde September 1942
  - 155th (Mixed) HAA Rgt – from 57 AA Bde August 1942; unbrigaded unit September 1942
  - 170th (Mixed) HAA Rgt – new unit raised August 1942
  - 18th LAA Rgt – to 63 AA Bde Summer 1941
  - 81st LAA Rgt – from 5th AA Division May 1942; to 3 AA Bde by October 1942
  - 3rd AA 'Z' Regiment – from 3rd AA Division Summer 1941; rejoined 3rd AA Division May 1942
  - 11th AA 'Z' Regiment – from 63 AA Bde Summer 1941
- 51 AA Brigade' – joined August 1942
  - 100th HAA Rgt – from 57 AA Bde June 1942; unbrigaded unit September 1942
  - 113th HAA Rgt
  - 114th HAA Rgt
  - 147th HAA Rgt – to 42 AA Bde September 1942
  - 130th (Queen's Edinburgh, Royal Scots) LAA Rgt
  - 131st LAA Rgt
- 57th AA Brigade – joined May 1942
  - 60th (City of London) HAA – from 42 AA Bde May 1942; unbrigaded unit June 1942
  - 100th HAA Rgt – from 42 AA Bde May 1942; to 51 AA Bde June 1942
  - 134th (Mixed) HAA Rgt– from 11th AA Division August 1942; returned by October 1942
  - 155th (Mixed) HAA Rgt – new unit raised March 1942; to 42 AA Bde August 1942
  - 4 AA 'Z' Rgt – from 4th AA Division August 1942
- 63 AA Brigade
  - 17th LAA Rgt – from 6th AA Division by December 1941; left AA Command June 1942; later to Operation Torch
  - 18th LAA Rgt – from 42 AA Bde Summer 1941; to Tenth Army in Iraq March 1942
  - 57th (Glasgow) LAA Rgt
  - 60th LAA Rgt – to 5th AA Division by December 1941
  - 84th LAA Rgt – new unit raised August 1941; joined December 1941; to 3 AA Bde June 1942
  - 135th LAA Rgt – from 3rd AA Division June 1942; left July 1942
  - 86th S/L Rgt – converted into 120th LAA Rgt January 1942; to 2nd AA Division September 1942
  - 11th AA 'Z' Regiment – to 42 AA Bde Summer 1941

The increased sophistication of Operations Rooms and communications was reflected in the growth in support units, which attained the following organisation by May 1942:

- 12th AA Division Mixed Signal Unit HQ, RCS
  - HQ No 1 Company
    - 12th AA Division Mixed Signal Office Section
    - 404th AA Gun Operations Room Mixed Signal Section (Glasgow & Clyde)
      - 9th AA Sub-Gun Operations Room Mixed Signal Sub-Section
      - 10th AA Sub-Gun Operations Room Mixed Signal Sub-Section
      - 11th AA Sub-Gun Operations Room Mixed Signal Sub-Section
      - 12th AA Sub-Gun Operations Room Mixed Signal Sub-Section
      - 13th AA Sub-Gun Operations Room Mixed Signal Sub-Section
      - 14th AA Sub-Gun Operations Room Mixed Signal Sub-Section
    - 42nd AA Brigade Signal Office Mixed Sub-Section
    - 335th AA Gun Operations Room Mixed Signal Section (Inverkip)
    - 57th AA Brigade Signal Office Mixed Sub-Section
    - 63rd AA Brigade Signal Office Mixed Sub-Section
    - 206th RAF Fighter Sector Sub-Section (RAF Ayr)
    - 326th AA Gun Operations Room Mixed Signal Section (Ardeer)
    - 327th AA Gun Operations Room Mixed Signal Section (Stranraer)
    - 30th AA Line Maintenance Section
  - HQ No 2 Company (Northern Ireland District)
    - 410th AA Gun Operations Room Mixed Signal Section (Northern Ireland District)
      - 30th AA Sub-Gun Operations Room Mixed Signal Sub-Section
      - 31st AA Sub-Gun Operations Room Mixed Signal Sub-Section
    - 3rd AA Brigade Signal Office Mixed Sub-Section
    - 207th RAF Fighter Sector Sub-Section (RAF Ballyhalbert)
    - 337th AA Gun Operations Room Mixed Signal Section (Londonderry)
    - 208th RAF Fighter Sector Sub-Section (RAF Eglinton)
    - 209th RAF Fighter Sector Sub-Section (RAF St Angelo)
    - 31st AA Line Maintenance Section
    - 32nd AA Line Maintenance Section
- HQ 12th AA Division RASC
  - 36th Company
  - 195th Company (Northern Ireland District)
  - 909th Company
- 12th AA Div RAMC
- 12th AA Div Workshop Company, RAOC
- 12th AA Div Radio Maintenance Company, RAOC

The RAOC companies became part of the new Royal Electrical and Mechanical Engineers (REME) during 1942.

== Disbandment ==
A reorganisation of AA Command in October 1942 saw the AA divisions disbanded and replaced by a smaller number of AA Groups more closely aligned with the groups of RAF Fighter Command. The 12th AA Division amalgamated with the 3rd and the 7th AA Divisions to form the 6th AA Group, based at Edinburgh and cooperating with No. 14 Group RAF, while Northern Ireland became the 7th AA Group based at Belfast and working with No. 9 Group RAF. Major-General Rickards retired. The 12th AA Divisional Signals was amalgamated back into its parent 3rd AA Divisional Signals as the 6th AA Group (Mixed) Signals.

== General Officer Commanding ==
The following officer commanded 12th AA Division:

- Major-General Gerald Rickards (15 November 1940 – 30 September 1942)

== External sources ==
- British Military History
- Generals of World War II
- Royal Artillery 1939–1945
