= 90th Searchlight Regiment, Royal Artillery =

90th Searchlight Regiment, RA
- Royal Artillery cap badge
- Active: 25 March 1941 – 4 August 1943
- Country: United Kingdom
- Branch: British Army
- Type: Searchlight
- Role: Air Defence
- Size: 3 Batteries
- Part of: 3rd AA Brigade

The 90th Searchlight Regiment, Royal Artillery, was a short-lived air defence unit of the British Army during World War II. It served in Anti-Aircraft Command from 1941 to 1943, mainly in Northern Ireland, and never deployed overseas.

== Origin ==
90th Searchlight Regiment (90th S/L Rgt) was created during the rapid expansion of AA defences during The Blitz. Regimental Headquarters (RHQ) was formed at the HQ of 3rd AA Brigade at Orangefield House, Belfast, Northern Ireland, on 25 March 1941. On 5 May it was allocated three S/L batteries numbered 546, 548 and 560. The batteries came from different training regiments, where each had been formed around a cadre of experienced officers and men drawn from existing S/L units:

- 546 S/L Bty, formed on 16 January by 230th S/L Training Rgt at Blandford Camp from a cadre of experienced officers and men provided by 28th (Essex) S/L Rgt
- 548 S/L Bty, formed on 16 January by 233rd S/L Training Rgt at Saighton Camp, cadre from 29th (Kent) S/L Rgt
- 560 S/L Bty, formed on 13 February by 237th S/L Training Rgt at Holywood, Northern Ireland, cadre from 72nd (Middlesex) S/L Rgt

== Service ==
Formation sign of 12th AA Division.

The regiment was immediately assigned to 3rd AA Bde covering Northern Ireland in 12th AA Division. This brigade had just been through the Belfast Blitz and was being reinforced, (the new 91st S/L Rgt joined at the same time as 90th) but after May 1941 there were only rare incursions by enemy aircraft over Northern Ireland.

The role of the S/L units was to track and illuminate raiders for the Heavy AA (HAA) guns of the Gun Defence Areas (GDAs) and for the few available Royal Air Force (RAF) Night fighters. In November 1940 AA Command had adopted a system of clustering three S/Ls together to improve illumination, but this meant that the clusters had to be spaced 10,400 yards (9,500 m) apart. This layout was an attempt to improve the chances of picking up enemy bombers and keeping them illuminated for engagement by AA guns or night fighters. Eventually, one light in each cluster was to be equipped with Searchlight Control radar (SLC) and act as 'master light', but the radar equipment was still in short supply.

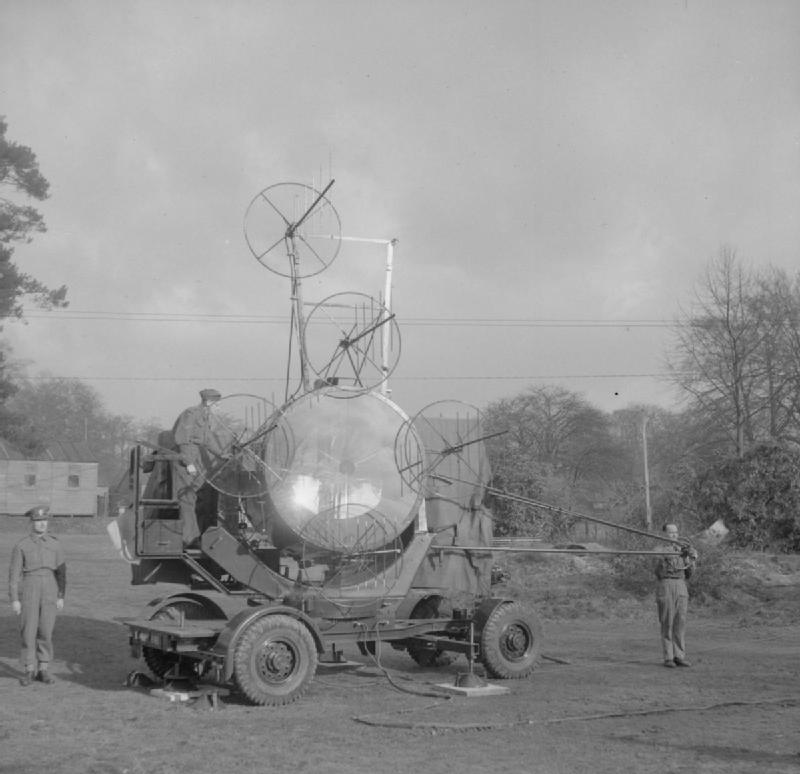
150 cm S/L with AA Radar No 2.

Later SLC radar became more widely available and towards the end of 1941 the lights in Northern Ireland were redeployed singly to form a 'killer belt' primarily to assist night fighters. This system required fewer lights, and in November 1941 AA Command decided that 91st S/L Rgt would be converted to the LAA gun role as 114th LAA Rgt. 90th Searchlight Rgt remained as the only S/L unit in Northern Ireland.

A reorganisation of AA Command in October 1942 saw the AA corps and divisions disbanded to be replaced by a smaller number of AA Groups more closely aligned with the groups of RAF Fighter Command. 12th AA Division amalgamated with 3rd and 7th AA Divisions to form 6 AA Group in Scotland, while Northern Ireland came under a separate 7 AA Group based at Belfast and working with No. 9 Group RAF. There was now no need for two AA headquarters in Northern Ireland and 3 AA Bde disappeared during October.

90th Searchlight Rgt remained directly responsible to 7 AA Gp until April 1943 when it was moved to 5 AA Group in the East Midlands and Humberside. However, the regiment remained unbrigaded.

== Disbandment ==
With the lower threat of attack by the weakened Luftwaffe, AA Command was forced to release manpower for the planned invasion of Normandy (Operation Overlord). All Home Defence S/L regiments were reduced, and some like 90th were run down altogether. The regiment and its three batteries began disbanding on 4 August 1943 and completed the process by the end of the month.
