= 3rd Anti-Aircraft Brigade =

3rd Anti-Aircraft Brigade (SR) 51 (Ulster) Anti-Aircraft Brigade (TA)
- Active: 7 December 1938–October 1942; 1 January 1947 – 31 October 1955
- Country: United Kingdom
- Branch: British Army
- Type: Anti-aircraft unit
- Role: Anti-aircraft warfare
- Size: Brigade
- Part of: 3 AA Division; British Expeditionary Force; 12 AA Division
- Garrison/HQ: Belfast (1938–42); Holywood (1947–55)
- Engagements: Battle of France; Operation Aerial; Belfast Blitz

3rd Anti-Aircraft Brigade (3 AA Bde) was a Supplementary Reserve air defence formation of the British Army formed in Northern Ireland in 1938. On the outbreak of the Second World War it saw active service with the British Expeditionary Force during the Battle of France and Operation Aerial. It then returned to Northern Ireland and defended the Province for the next two years. Postwar, it was reformed in the Territorial Army and served until the disbandment of Anti-Aircraft Command in 1955.

== Origin ==
During the 1930s the development of airpower led the United Kingdom to expand its anti-aircraft (AA) defences, a process that accelerated after the Munich Crisis of 1938. 3rd Anti-Aircraft Brigade formed on 7 December 1938 at Belfast to take command of the growing number of AA units in Northern Ireland. The Territorial Army (TA) did not exist in Northern Ireland at that time so the part-time units in the Province were part of the Supplementary Reserve (SR) and were numbered in sequence after the Regulars. The brigade formed part of 3rd AA Division, which was responsible for the defence of Scotland and Northern Ireland under Anti-Aircraft Command. It was commanded by Brigadier P.L. Vining.

=== Order of Battle 1939 ===
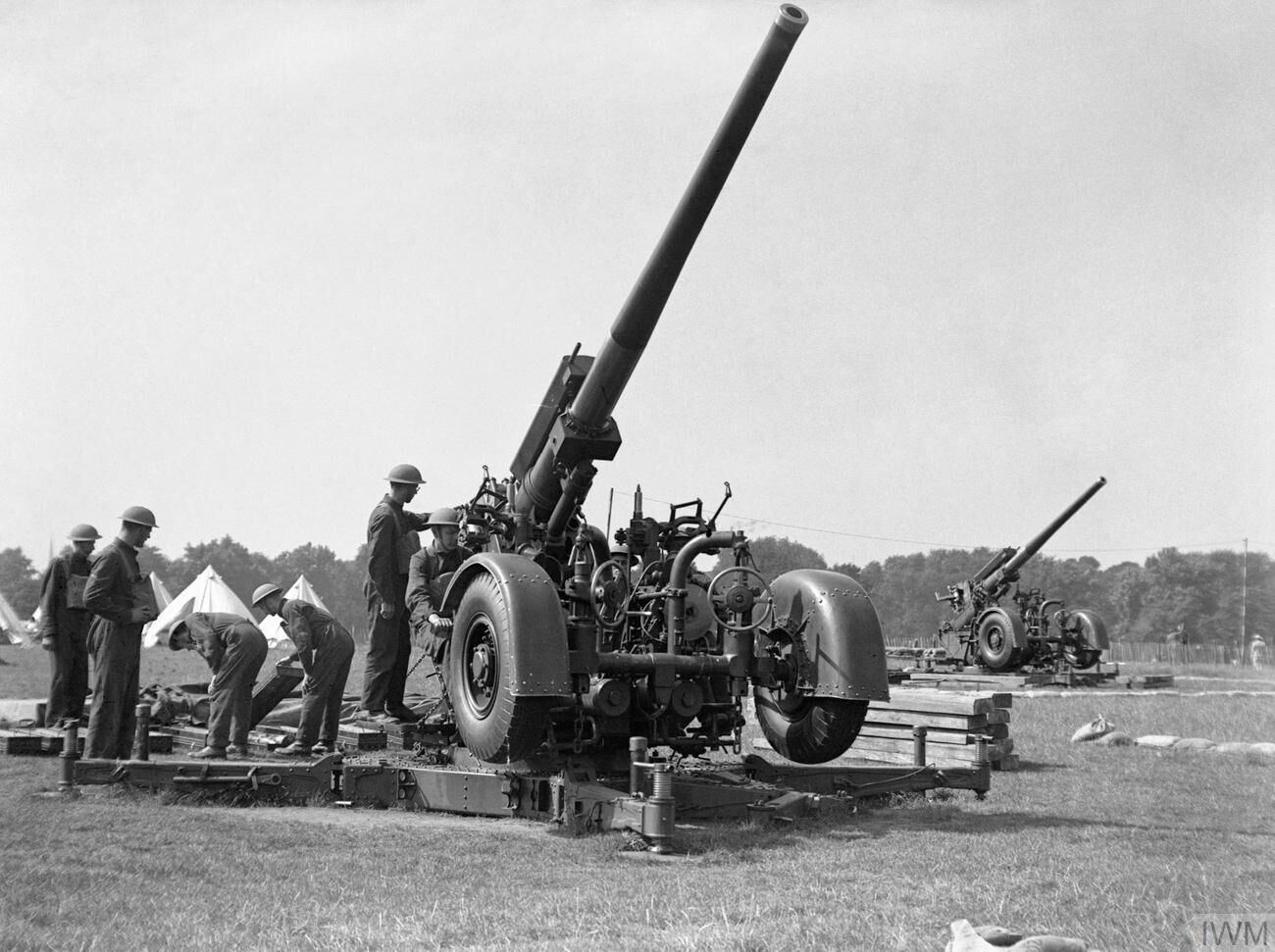
Mobile 3.7-inch AA guns deployed in 1939.

On the outbreak of war, the brigade was composed as follows:

- 8th (Belfast) AA Regiment, RA (SR) – formed 1939
  - HQ Battery at Belfast
  - 21st AA Battery at Belfast
  - 22nd AA Battery at Belfast
  - 23rd AA Battery at Belfast
  - 5th Light Anti-Aircraft (LAA) Battery at Newtownards
- 9th (Londonderry) AA Regiment, RA (SR) – formed 1939
  - HQ Battery at Derry
  - 24th AA Battery at Derry
  - 25th AA Battery at Derry
  - 26th AA Battery at Ballymena
  - 6th LAA Battery at Coleraine
- 102nd AA Regiment, RA (TA) – formed at Antrim 10 September 1939
  - 314th, 315th, 316th AA Batteries at Antrim
  - 174th, 175th LAA Batteries at Antrim
- 3rd (Ulster) Searchlight Regiment, RA (SR) – formed 1939
  - HQ Battery at 1 Embankment, Sunnyside Street, Belfast
  - 9th S/L Battery at Clonaver, Strandtown
  - 10th S/L Battery at Belfast
  - 11th S/L Battery at Belfast
  - 12th S/L Battery at Lurgan
- 3 AA Brigade Signal Section, Royal Corps of Signals (RCS)
- 92 AA Brigade Company, Royal Army Service Corps (RASC)
- 3 AA Brigade Workshop Section, Royal Army Ordnance Corps (RAOC)

== Second World War ==
=== Phoney War ===
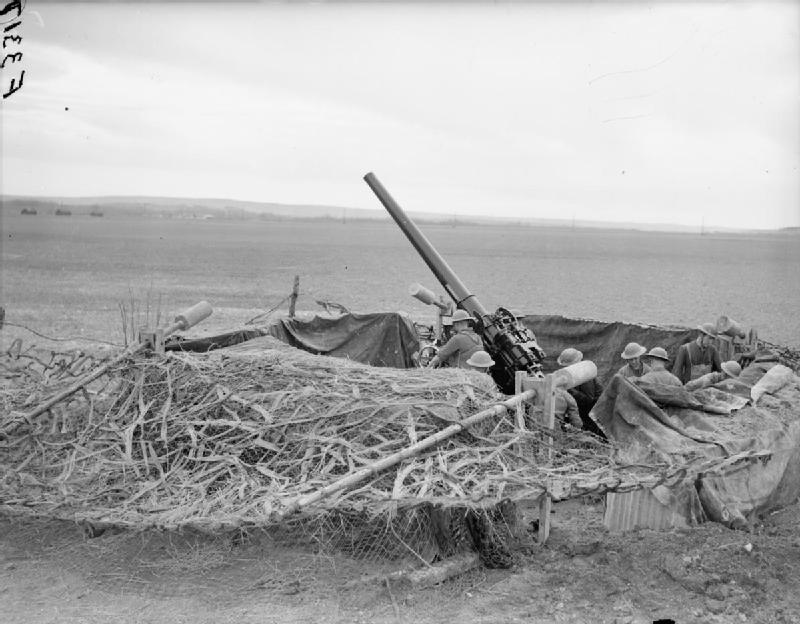
3.7-inch gun deployed in France March 1940.

On 24 August, ahead of the declaration of war, AA Command was fully mobilised and the SR units in Northern Ireland went to their war stations around the Province. In November 1939, however, 3 AA Bde HQ and some of its units crossed to France to defend the lines of communication of the British Expeditionary Force (BEF). It deployed around the port of Le Havre with the following initial composition:

- 2nd AA Rgt (Regular) – 24 x 3.7-inch guns
- 4th AA Rgt (Regular) – 16 x 3-inch guns, 8 x 3.7-inch
- 2 Independent LAA Bty (Regular) – 12 x Bofors 40 mm guns
- 4 Independent LAA Bty (Regular) – 12 x Bofors guns
- 165 LAA Bty – detached from 54th (Argyll and Sutherland Highlanders) LAA Rgt (TA); 12 x Bofors guns

=== Battle of France ===
By 10 May, when the Phoney War ended with the German invasion of the Low Countries, 3 AA Bde was commanded by Brig W.R. Shilstone and had the following composition:

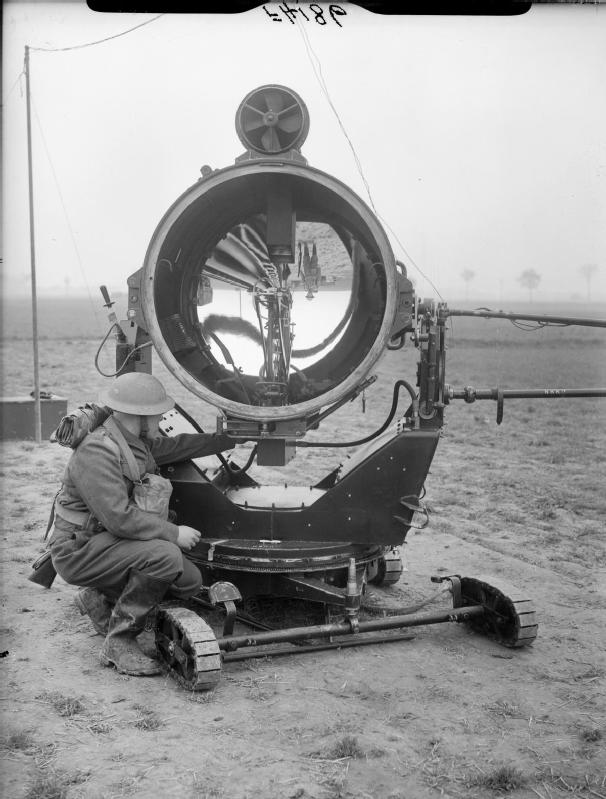
Searchlight of 10 S/L Bty, 3rd (Ulster) S/L Rgt in France, May 1940.

- 2nd AA Rgt – at Boulogne
  - 4, 5, 6 AA Btys
- 8th (Belfast) AA Rgt (SR) – at Le Havre
  - 22 AA Bty
  - 21 AA Bty – detached to Arras
  - 23 AA Bty – detached to Honfleur under 79th (HY) HAA Rgt
- 79th (Hertfordshire Yeomanry) AA Rgt (TA) – at Le Havre
  - 246 (1st Watford) AA Bty – 4 x static 3.7-inch, 4 x mobile 3.7-inch, 1 x Gun-Laying (GL) Radar Mk I, at Le Havre Mole
  - 247 (2nd Watford) AA Bty – 8 x mobile 3.7-inch, 1 x GL Mk. I at Sainte-Adresse and Octeville-sur-Mer
  - 248 (Welwyn) AA Bty – 8 x static 3.7-inch at Cape la Heve
  - 4 Ind LAA Bty – 8 x static Bofors,4 x mobile Bofors
  - 174 LAA Bty – detached from 58th (Argyll & Sutherland Highlanders) LAA Rgt; 4 x Vickers 2-pounders at Honfleur

Although 79th (HY) AA Rgt had some gun-laying radar sets, the brigade still had no searchlights in position. Consequently, Brig Shilstone and Lieutenant-Colonel R.C. Raikes of 79th (HY) AA Rgt (the AA Defence Commander (AADC) for Le Havre) devised an AA barrage scheme using fixed bearings and staggered heights over the docks and oil storage tanks of Le Havre for 'unseen' fire at night; this was codenamed 'Pillar of Fire'. From 10 to 19 May the only Luftwaffe activity in the Le Havre area was daily reconnaissance flights, but on the night of 19/20 May there was a three-hour raid on the French airfield at Octeville, during which 'Pillar of fire' brought down an enemy aircraft, followed on succeeding nights by attempts to drop Parachute mines into the harbour entrance.

The brigade was due to be reinforced by a TA searchlight unit of the Royal Engineers, 37th (Tyne Electrical Engineers) AA Battalion but the Battle of France had already begun when Battalion HQ and a Composite Company landed at Dunkirk on 16 May, followed by 307 Company the next day. They found the roads choked by streams of refugees fleeing the advancing Germans. They eventually took up positions at Le Havre (307 Coy with 24 lights) and Harfleur (Composite Coy with 13 lights). The crossing of the rest of the battalion to Dunkirk had been cancelled, and the two other companies (348 and 349) were sent instead to Cherbourg. Part of 349 Coy landed there on 19 May and entrained for Le Havre, but returned to Cherbourg after a 900 miles (1,400 km) trip round France. 348 Coy also landed at Cherbourg on 20 May and proceeded to Rennes.

By now, the Panzers of the Wehrmacht's Army Group A had broken through the Ardennes and threatened the BEF's flank. 210 AA Battery of 73rd AA Rgt and two Troops of 8 S/L Bty of 2nd Searchlight Rgt had been defending Conteville and Crécy airfields under 2 AA Bde when the German forces took nearby Péronne. On 20 May they were ordered to move south-west to Rouen to come under 3 AA Bde. However, 2nd Panzer Division was already in Abbeville blocking the way, and the battery had to fight a rearguard action with enemy ground troops to get to the coast and make it back to Dunkirk.

3 AA Bde was now cut off from the bulk of the BEF, which was preparing to evacuate from Dunkirk (Operation Dynamo). Even after this ended on 3 June, there were still British forces in France north of the Seine, and 79th (HY) HAA Rgt maintained its defences at Le Havre covering the Seine ferries. As AADC, Lt-Col Raikes had a troop of 174 LAA Bty and 307 AA Coy, in addition to his own regiment and 4 LAA Bty: a total of 22 x 3.7-inch, 8 x Bofors, 4 x 2-pounders and 24 S/Ls. There were also some Barrage balloons and French AA guns. Nightly air attacks on the Le Havre harbour area began in earnest on 3/4 June, with the guns in action for long periods.

By 8 June, under renewed German attacks, 1st Armoured Division, the 51st (Highland) Infantry Division and assorted other British forces were withdrawing to the Seine. That night, with much of the town and oil depots set on fire by the raids, 'Cuckoo Section' of 79th (HY) AA Rgt ferried the highly secret GL radar transmitter and receiver trailers across the river to Honfleur, followed by 247 AA Bty with the mobile guns.

=== Operation Aerial ===
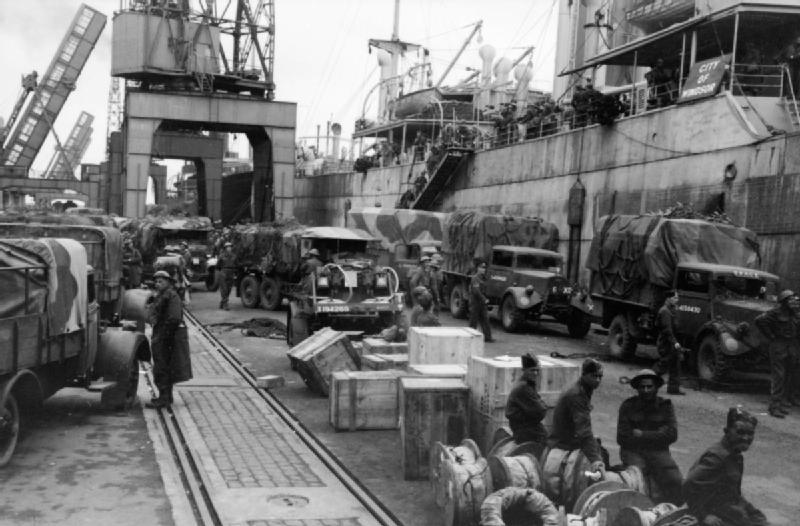
Motor transport on the quay at Cherbourg during Operation Aerial, 13 June 1940.

With the enemy closing in on Le Havre (51st (H) Division was cut off and forced to surrender at St Valery), 3 AA Bde was ordered to deploy for the defence of the ports of Cherbourg, Nantes, St Malo and St Nazaire, which were needed to evacuate the remaining British forces (Operation Aerial). On 9 June, 3 AA Bde HQ and Cuckoo Section of 79th (HY) HAA Rgt moved to Martigné, while Bn HQ and Composite Bty of 37th (TEE) AA Bn went to St Malo, taking command of the heavy and light AA guns of 23 AA Bty, and was joined by one troop of 307 S/L Coy from the south side of the Seine. The 79th (HY) AA Rgt group continued to defend the Le Havre area while the Seine ferries were still in use. By now Le Havre was under continuous bombing attacks and threatened by land: 307 AA Coy provided a detachment armed with light machine-guns and anti-tank rifles to reinforce the land defences.

Once the ferry was destroyed on 10 June 307 AA Coy was ordered to wreck its equipment and was evacuated by sea to Cherbourg. Similarly, on the night of 11/12 June 246 AA Bty disabled its static guns and boarded the Southern Railway ferry SS Brittany, which took the men to Cherbourg. RHQ of 79 (HY) AA Rgt and most of 248 AA Bty followed the next night aboard SS St Briac. In a week of prolonged action, 15 enemy aircraft had been destroyed and many of the dive-bombing attacks by Junkers Ju 87 Stukas disrupted.

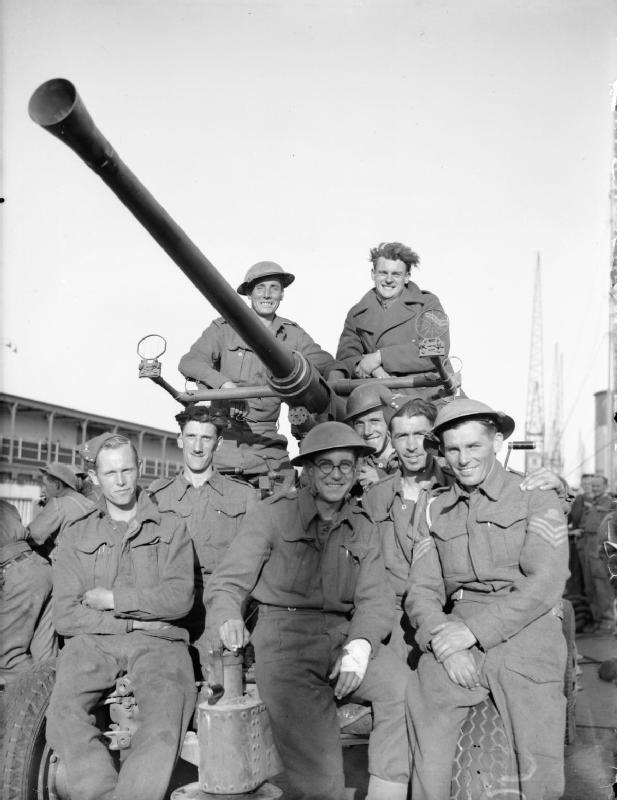
Bofors gun and crew on the quayside at Southampton having been evacuated from Cherbourg, 19 June 1940.

Cuckoo Section moved to Nantes on 11 June; on 14 June it was joined by two transmitters and receivers from 73rd HAA Rgt and on 16 June by two more transmitters. With great difficulty, the section got all the secret equipment aboard the SS Marslew which sailed on 18 June and docked at Falmouth the following day.

Operation Aerial to evacuate the remainder of the British forces from France was now under way. From Cherbourg, RHQ 79th (HY) AA Rgt and the two batteries without equipment were shunted by train between Nantes and Rennes before being evacuated from St Nazaire aboard SS Duchess of York and reaching Liverpool on 18 June. The party of 248 Bty that had stayed to disable the guns was evacuated through St Malo. 247 Battery, operating directly under 3 AA Bde, deployed to defend Rennes and then moved to St Nazaire on 18 June, when it dumped its disabled guns in the dock and boarded SS Glenaffric and was evacuated to Plymouth.

On 17 June 348 and 349 Companies destroyed their remaining equipment and moved from Rennes and Cherbourg to the ports at Brest, St Malo, and St Nazaire from where 37th (TEE) AA Bn was evacuated to Southampton, one of the last British units to leave France. Some of its personnel were aboard the Lancastria when she was sunk off St Nazaire with heavy loss of life, but all except two of the party were rescued.

=== Belfast Blitz ===
12 AA Division's formation sign

On arrival in England the evacuated AA troops were sent to various AA training camps to reform, and 3 AA Bde HQ returned to Northern Ireland. Because most of the SR units had been sent to join the BEF, Belfast was defended by only seven heavy AA guns by 11 July. In June 1940 those AA regiments equipped with 3-inch or the newer 3.7-inch guns were termed Heavy Anti-Aircraft (HAA) to distinguish them from the new Light Anti-Aircraft (LAA) units being formed. (Prior to that, some of the Regular Army and SR regiments had included both HAA and LAA batteries.) In August, all the Royal Engineers AA battalions were transferred to the Royal Artillery as Searchlight (S/L) regiments.

AA Command rapidly expanded during the Battle of Britain and the following Luftwaffe night campaign against UK cities known as the Blitz. Five new AA divisions were created on 1 November 1940, including 12 AA Division, which was formed by separating responsibility for Northern Ireland and Western Scotland (particularly the industrial areas of Clydeside and Ayrshire) from the existing 3 AA Division. 3 AA Brigade came under the command of this new formation. In AA Command, signals detachments for AA brigade signals were provided from divisional units so 3 AA Bde Signals, the SR unit that had served in France, transferred to 2 AA Bde and went with that formation to Egypt in November 1940 Among the new units formed were 90th and 91st SL Rgts; one of 91st S/L Rgt's batteries deployed straight from 237th S/L Training Rgt at Holywood near Belfast.

Although its shipyards made Belfast an important target, the city did not receive a major bombing raid until nearly the end of the Blitz, when two attacks on 15 April and 4 May (the Belfast Blitz) caused widespread damage and loss of life.

=== Order of Battle 1940–41 ===
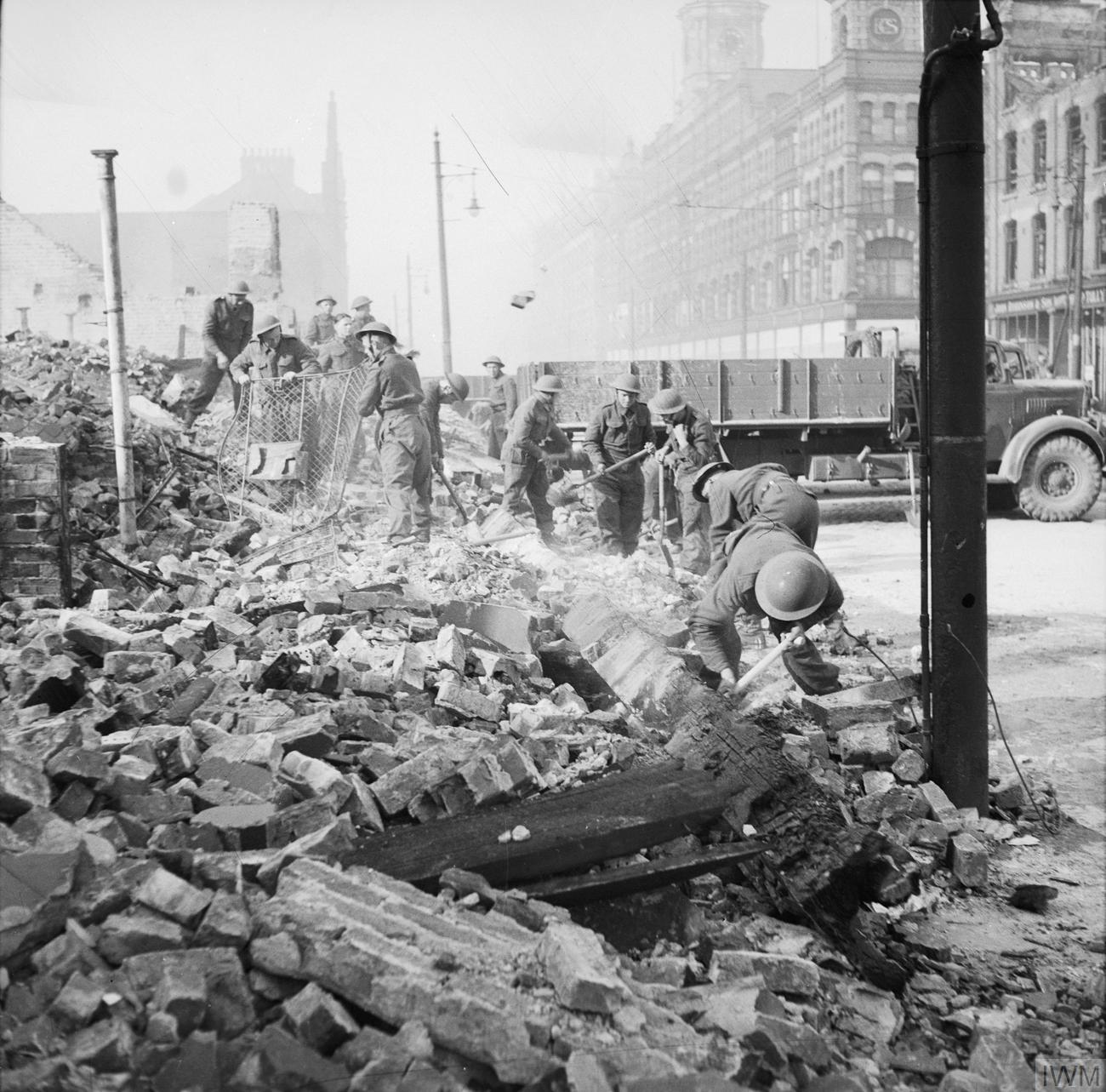
Soldiers clearing rubble after the May air raid on Belfast

By the end of the Blitz in May 1941, the brigade's composition had become as follows:

- 102nd HAA Rgt
  - 314, 315, 316 HAA Btys
- 66th LAA Rgt – new unit raised December 1940 from LAA batteries of 102nd HAA Rgt
  - 175, 176, 251 LAA Btys
- 90th S/L Rgt – new unit raised March 1941
  - 546, 548, 560 S/L Btys
- 91st S/L Rgt – new unit raised March 1941
  - 549, 550, 552, 553 S/L Btys
- 2 Company, 12 AA Divisional Signals, RCS – expanded from a Glasgow company of 3 AA Divisional Signals
- 195 Company RASC

=== Mid-War ===
After May 1941 there were only rare incursions by enemy aircraft over Northern Ireland. Newly-formed units continued to join AA Command, the HAA and support units increasingly becoming 'Mixed', indicating that women of the Auxiliary Territorial Service (ATS) were fully integrated into them.

Searchlights had been deployed in clusters of three lights since November 1940. The cluster system was an attempt to improve the chances of picking up enemy bombers and keeping them illuminated for engagement by AA guns or night-fighters. Eventually, one light in each cluster was to be equipped with Searchlight Control (SLC) radar and act as 'master light', but the radar equipment was still in short supply. Later SLC radar and GL radar for the HAA guns became more widely available. Towards the end of 1941 the lights in Northern Ireland were redeployed singly to form a 'killer belt' primarily to assist night-fighters. This system required fewer lights, and in November 1941 AA Command decided that 91st S/L Rgt would be converted to the LAA gun role as 114th LAA Rgt. In December the batteries went to Holywood, where they were retrained by what was now 237th LAA Training Rgt, and surplus manpower was drafted to other units.

=== Order of Battle 1941–42 ===
During this period the division was composed as follows (temporary attachments omitted):

- 1st HAA Rgt from 4 AA Division July 1941
  - 1, 17 HAA Btys
  - 2 HAA Bty – attached to 11 AA Division
- 102nd HAA Rgt – to 6 AA Division by October 1942
  - 314, 315, 316 HAA Btys
  - 431 HAA Bty – joined February 1942
- 111th HAA Rgt – from 42 AA Bde at Glasgow June 1941
  - 347, 355, 356, 389 HAA Btys
- 66th LAA Rgt – to 6 AA Division June 1942
  - 175, 176 LAA Btys
  - 251 LAA Bty – to 84th LAA Rgt by May 1942
  - 459 LAA Bty – joined February 1942

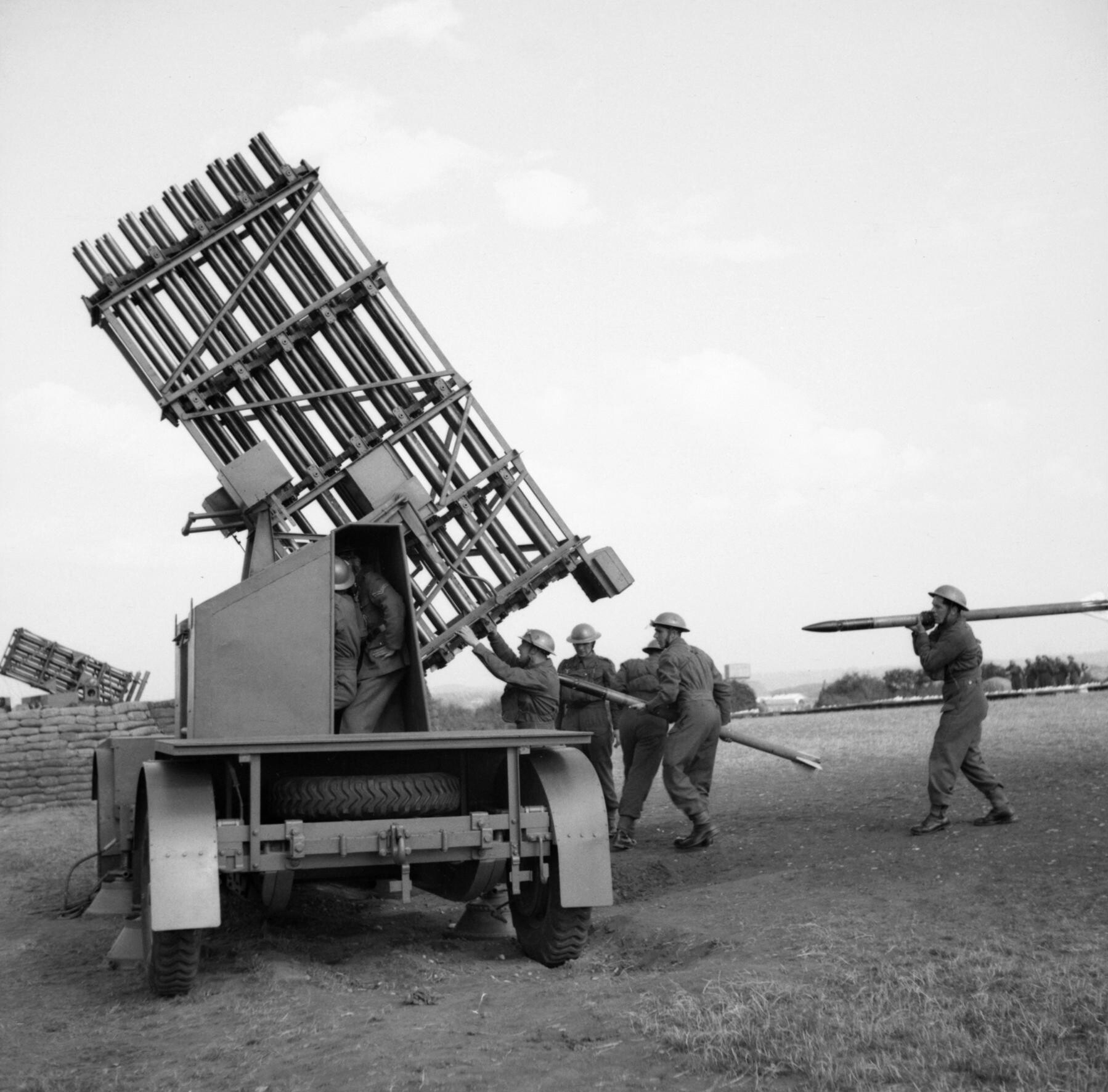
Loading a mobile multiple 4-inch Z projector June 1941

  - 146 AA 'Z' Bty – joined June 1941, equipped with Z Battery rocket launchers
- 81st LAA Rgt – from 42 AA Bde by October 1942
  - 199, 261, 307, 472 LAA Btys
- 84th LAA Rgt – from 63 AA Bde in West Scotland June 1942; to 9 AA Division by October 1942
  - 177, 201, 448 LAA Btys
  - 251 LAA Bty – from 66th LAA Rgt by May 1942
- 90th S/L Rgt
  - 546, 548, 560 S/L Btys
- 91st S/L Rgt – converted into 114th LAA Rgt January 1942; then to 4 AA Division
  - 549, 550, 551, 552 S/L Btys
- 2 Company, 12 AA Division Mixed Signal Unit
  - 3 AA Brigade Signal Office Mixed Sub-Section
  - 410 AA Gun Operations Room Mixed Signal Section
    - 30 AA Sub-Gun Operations Room Mixed Signal Sub-Section
    - 31 AA Sub-Gun Operations Room Mixed Signal Sub-Section
  - 337 AA Gun Operations Room Mixed Signal Section (Londonderry)
  - 207 RAF Fighter Sector Sub-Section (RAF Ballyhalbert)
  - 208 RAF Fighter Sector Sub-Section (RAF Eglinton)
  - 209 RAF Fighter Sector Sub-Section (RAF St Angelo)
- 195 Company RASC

== Disbandment and 7th Anti-Aircraft Group ==
A reorganisation of AA Command in October 1942 saw the AA corps and divisions disbanded to be replaced by a smaller number of AA Groups more closely aligned with the groups of RAF Fighter Command. 12 AA Division amalgamated with 3 and 7 AA Divisions to form 6 AA Group, while Northern Ireland came under a separate 7th Anti-Aircraft Group based at Belfast and working with No. 9 Group RAF. There was now no need for two AA headquarters in Northern Ireland and 3 AA Bde disappeared during October, its personnel being incorporated into 7 AA Group HQ and its units commanded directly by the Group. The brigade was formally disbanded on 30 September 1944.

In November 1944, the 7th Anti-Aircraft Group was disbanded (along with the 3rd and 4th AA Anti-Aircraft Groups).

== Postwar ==
When the Territorial Army was reconstituted in 1947, it was extended to Northern Ireland, and 3 AA Bde (SR) reformed at Holywood as 51 (Ulster) AA Bde (TA), taking the number of a pre-war LAA Bde. Operating under the command of 4 AA Group in North-West England, it had the following composition:

- 245 (Belfast) (M) HAA Rgt – former 8th (Belfast) HAA Rgt
- 246 (Derry) (M) HAA Rgt – former 9th (Londonderry) HAA Rgt
- 502 (Ulster) (M) HAA Rgt – former 102nd HAA Rgt
- 247 (Ulster) LAA Rgt – former 3rd (Ulster) S/L Rgt
- 248 (Ulster) LAA Rgt – former 4th (Ulster) LAA Rgt
- 51 Fire Control Troop
- 35 (Ulster) Independent AA Signal Squadron, RCS – became 51 (Ulster) AA Bde Signal Squadron 1952

(M) indicates a 'Mixed' unit, in which members of the Women's Royal Army Corps were integrated.

AA Command was disbanded on 10 March 1955, and all five AA regiments in the brigade were amalgamated to form a single 245 (Ulster) LAA Rgt (TA). The Brigade HQ was placed in suspended animation on 31 October 1955, and disbanded on 31 December 1957. After the disbandment, the signal squadron continued to serve independently as 11 (Ulster) Signal Liaison Squadron, eventually becoming 66 (City of Belfast) Signal Squadron in 40 (Ulster) Signal Regiment.

=== Insignia ===
Postwar, the units in 51 (Ulster) AA Bde wore a supplementary shoulder title of 'ULSTER' embroidered in RA red on dark blue, worn on battledress blouses beneath the standard RA title.
