= 102nd Heavy Anti-Aircraft Regiment, Royal Artillery =

102nd HAA Regiment, RA 502 (Ulster) HAA Regiment, RA
- Royal Artillery cap badge (pre-1953)
- Active: 25 August 1939– 16 January 1944; 1 January 1947 – 10 March 1955
- Country: United Kingdom
- Branch: Territorial Army
- Role: Air defence
- Size: Regiment
- Part of: 3 AA Brigade; 1 AA Bde; 51 (Ulster) AA Brigade
- Garrison/HQ: Antrim (1939–44); Ormeau Road, Belfast (1947–55)
- Engagements: Belfast Blitz

102nd Heavy Anti-Aircraft Regiment, Royal Artillery, was an air defence unit of Britain's Territorial Army (TA) formed at Antrim, Northern Ireland, during the period of international tension leading up to the outbreak of World War II. It defended Belfast and its shipyards during the early part of the war and then served in the Middle East. The regiment continued in the postwar TA until amalgamated in 1955.

== Formation ==
The Territorial Army was rapidly expanded following the Munich Crisis, particularly the Anti-Aircraft (AA) branch of the Royal Artillery (RA). (Note: Previous part-time AA units in Northern Ireland had been formed in the Supplementary Reserve, successors to the former Militia.) 102nd Anti-Aircraft Regiment, RA was one of the new units raised by the British Army in 1939. When the UK's Anti-Aircraft Command was mobilised in anticipation of war with Germany, the regiment was still in the process of being formed. The 102nd would go on to play an important role in the Second World War. The new regiment formed part of 3 AA Brigade defending Northern Ireland in 3rd AA Division, and had the following organisation:

- Regimental Headquarters (RHQ) at Antrim
- 314, 315, 316 AA Batteries formed 25 August 1939
- 175, 176 Light AA (LAA) Batteries formed and regimented 10 September 1939

== World War II ==
In November 1939, while 102nd AA Rgt was still forming, 3rd AA Bde HQ and some of its units were deployed to France with the British Expeditionary Force (BEF). On 1 June 1940, those AA regiments equipped with 3-inch or heavier guns were termed Heavy Anti-Aircraft (HAA); this included 102nd AA Regiment, despite its hybrid HAA/LAA organisation. By the time 3 AA Bde HQ returned to Belfast after the Battle of France had been lost and the BEF evacuated without its equipment, there were only seven HAA guns to defend the city.

=== Belfast Blitz ===
12 AA Division's formation sign

AA Command rapidly expanded during the Battle of Britain and the following Luftwaffe night campaign against UK cities known as the Blitz. Five new AA divisions were created on 1 November 1940, including 12th AA Division, which was formed by separating responsibility for Northern Ireland and the industrial areas of Western Scotland from 3rd AA Division. 3 AA Brigade came under the command of this new formation.

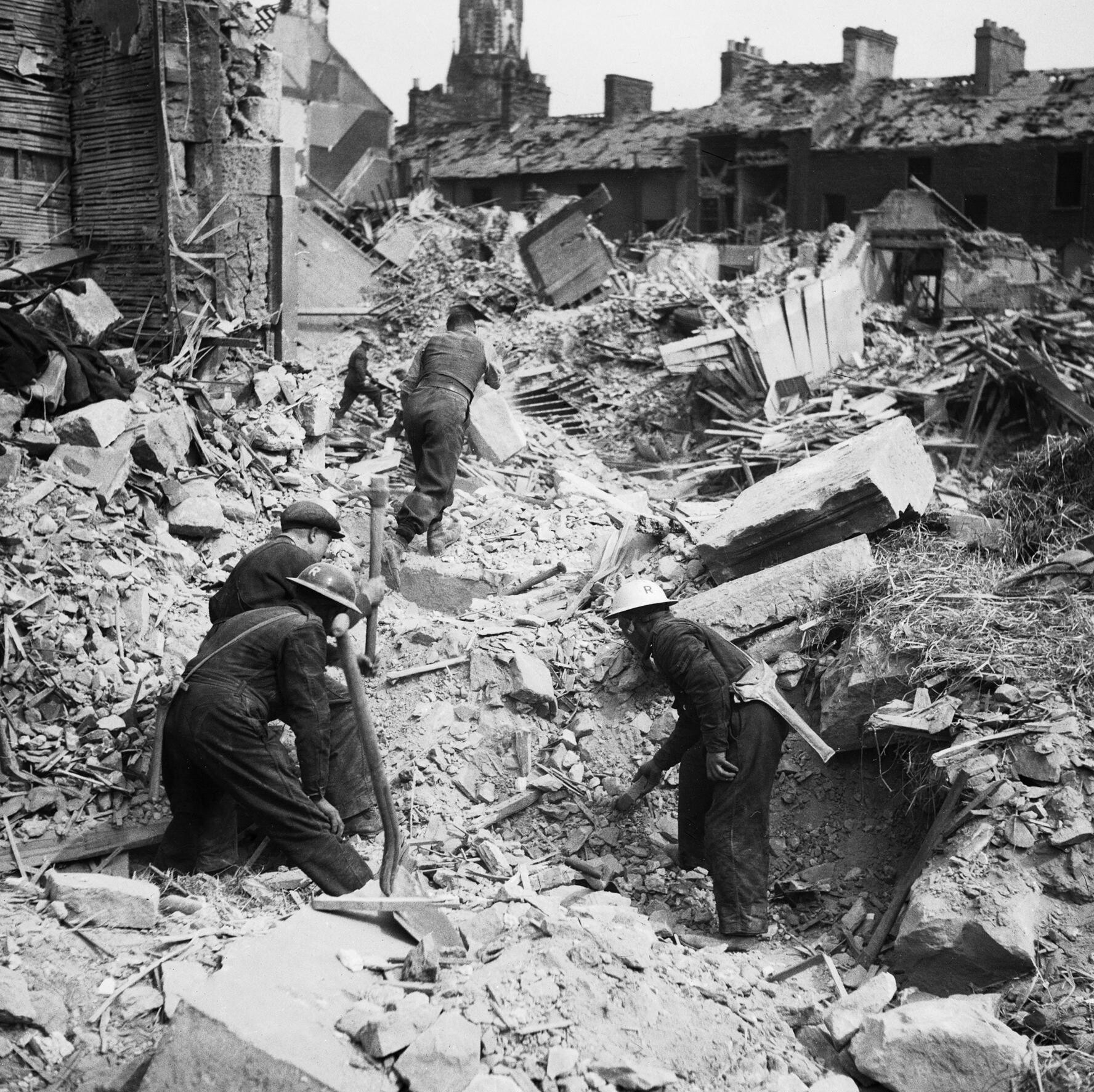
Rescue workers searching through rubble after an air raid on Belfast.

During this period, 102nd HAA Rgt was the only HAA unit available to 3 AA Bde. 175 and 176 LAA Batteries left the regiment on 1 December 1940 to form a separate 66th LAA Rgt at Belfast. This regiment later served in the Middle East. 102nd HAA Regiment also provided a cadre of experienced officers and men as the basis of a new 417 HAA Bty formed on 16 January 1941 at 211th HAA Training Rgt at Oswestry in Wales. This later joined 123rd HAA Rgt.

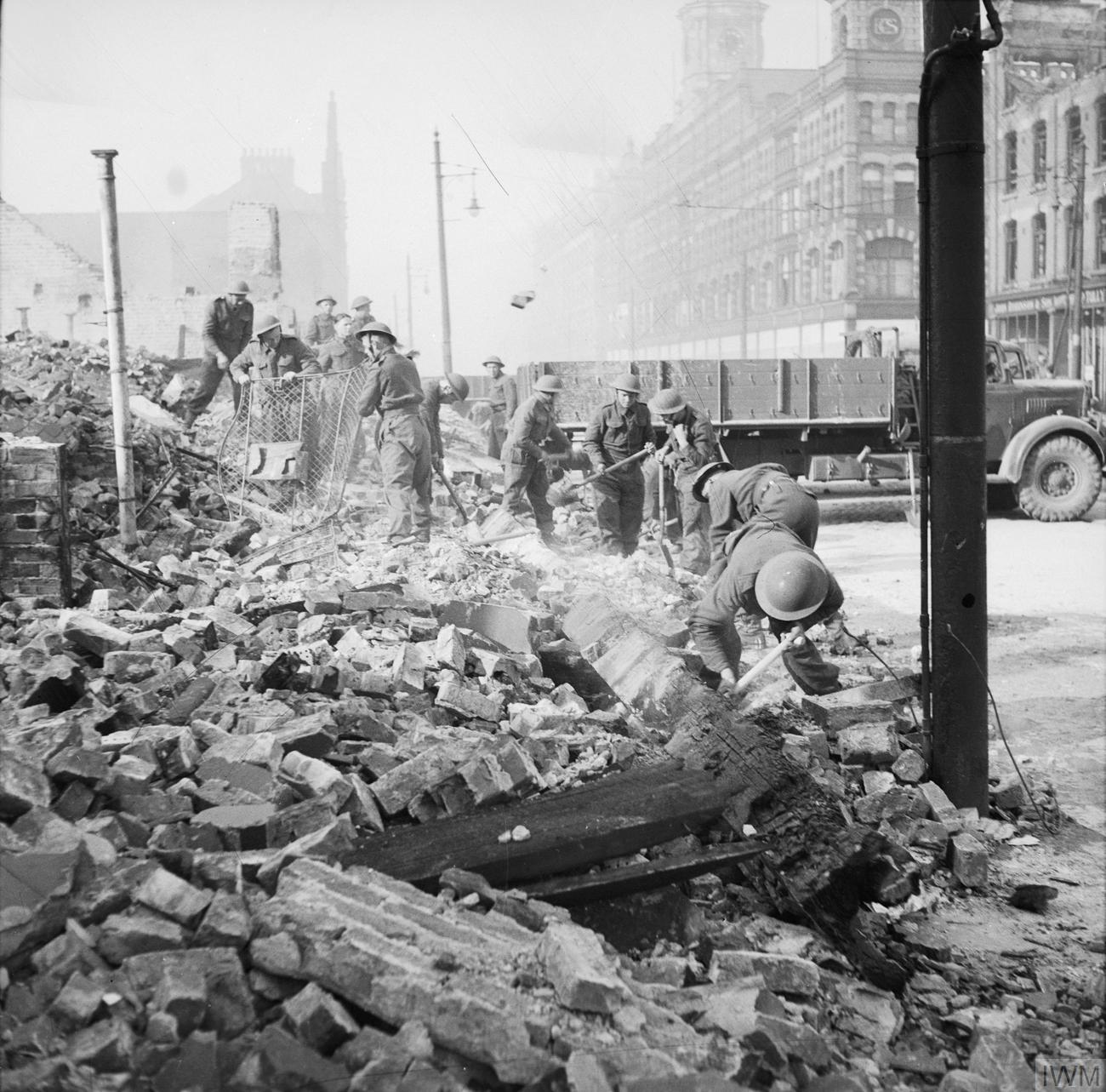
Troops clearing rubble after the May air raid on Belfast.

Although its shipyards made Belfast an important target, the city did not receive a major bombing raid until nearly the end of the Blitz, when two attacks on 15 April and 4 May (the Belfast Blitz) caused widespread damage and loss of life. After May 1941, there were only rare incursions by the Luftwaffe, though the strength of 3 AA Bde steadily increased.

=== Mid-war ===
There was little change in the mid-war years. On 12 January 1942, 431 HAA Bty joined the regiment from 64th (Northumbrian) HAA Rgt stationed in North East England. The battery moved on to 126th HAA Rgt in the West Country on 10 July 1942.

October 1942, AA Command was reorganised, replacing the AA divisions with a smaller number of AA Groups aligned with RAF Fighter Command. Northern Ireland came under a single 7 AA Group HQ and 3 AA Bde was disbanded, several of its units being made available for service elsewhere. 102nd HAA Regiment moved to 37 AA Bde, which operated the 'Thames North' AA layout on the north side of the Thames Estuary protecting London. But by early November, it was unbrigaded, and by late February, it had left AA Command completely and was on its way to the Middle East.

=== Middle East ===
102nd HAA Regiment had joined Middle East Forces (MEF) by late May 1943, and by early July, it had been assigned to Ninth Army in Palestine and Syria. At the end of the year, 102nd HAA Rgt was part of 1 AA Bde, which was responsible for the Levant area, including Haifa, Homs and Baalbek.

Earlier in the war, Haifa had been an important naval base and oil terminal. However, since the North African Campaign ended in May 1943, MEF had become a military backwater. At the beginning of 1944, the Eastern Mediterranean AA Group began to be run down: the air threat had diminished and the need to provide manpower for combat tasks elsewhere had become urgent. Surplus AA units in the region started to be disbanded; 102nd HAA Rgt was placed in suspended animation on 16 January 1944 and its personnel redeployed elsewhere.

== Postwar ==
When the TA was reconstituted on 1 January 1947, 102nd HAA Rgt was reformed as 502 (Ulster) (Mixed) Heavy Anti-Aircraft Regiment ('Mixed' indicating that members of the Women's Royal Army Corps were now integrated into the unit). Regimental HQ was now at Ormeau Road, Belfast. It formed part of 51 (Ulster) AA Brigade (the wartime 3 AA Bde).

When AA Command was disbanded on 10 March 1955, there was a large-scale reorganisation of its units. All the AA units in Northern Ireland were amalgamated into 245 (Ulster) Light Anti-Aircraft Regiment, to which 502 HAA Rgt contributed R Battery. With the reduction of the TA into the Territorial and Army Volunteer Reserve in 1967, this regiment in turn was amalgamated to form 102 (Ulster & Scottish) Light Air Defence Regiment.
