= 8th (Belfast) Heavy Anti-Aircraft Regiment, Royal Artillery =

Auxiliary unit of the British Army

8th (Belfast) Heavy Anti-Aircraft Regiment, RA 245 (Belfast) Heavy Anti-Aircraft Regiment, RA 245 (Ulster) Light Air Defence Regiment, RA
- Royal Artillery cap badge
- Active: 1 January 1939–1967
- Country: United Kingdom
- Branch: Supplementary Reserve
- Type: Heavy Anti-Aircraft
- Role: Air Defence
- Size: 3–4 Batteries
- Part of: British Expeditionary Force; Anti-Aircraft Command; XV Corps
- Garrison/HQ: Belfast
- Nickname: 'Twelve Mile Snipers'
- Engagements: Battle of France; Dunkirk evacuation The Blitz; Burma Campaign

The 8th (Belfast) Heavy Anti-Aircraft Regiment, Royal Artillery (Supplementary Reserve), was founded in the wake of the Munich crisis, and recruited mainly in the spring of 1939 from young men of the City and District of Belfast. During World War II it served in the Battle of France, the Blitz and the Burma Campaign. It was reformed postwar and its successor unit continues in the Army Reserve.

== Origin ==
During the period of rearmament before World War II the United Kingdom expanded its anti-aircraft (AA) defences by converting or creating units within the part-time Territorial Army (TA). However, the TA had not existed in Northern Ireland, so part-time auxiliary units in the province were formed in the Supplementary Reserve (SR) as successors to the traditional Militia. Two new AA regiments were formed in the province on 1 January 1939: the 8th at Belfast and 9th at Derry.

8th Anti-Aircraft Regiment, Royal Artillery (SR) was organised as follows:

- Regimental Headquarters (RHQ), Belfast
- 21st AA Battery
- 22nd AA Battery
- 23rd AA Battery
- 5th Light AA Bty at Newtownards

The regiment was granted the 'Belfast' subtitle on 8 May 1940, and designated Heavy AA (HAA) from 1 June that year.

== World War II ==
On the outbreak of war in September 1939, 8th AA Rgt mobilised at Belfast under the command of Lieutenant-Colonel J. Patrick. The AA units in Northern Ireland were grouped under 3rd Anti-Aircraft Brigade (SR). Unlike the TA units, who came under Anti-Aircraft Command, the wartime role of the SR was to reinforce the Regular Army. The regiment left for practice camp in Cornwall in October, and in November 1939 3rd AA Bde began deploying to France as part of the British Expeditionary Force (BEF). 3rd AA Brigade's role was to defend ports, bases, railway yards and line of communication routes. By the end of the 'Phoney War' in May 1940 21st HAA Bty was detached from 8th HAA Rgt and was serving under 4th AA Bde on GHQ tasks, including defence of supply points and airfields.

=== Battle of France ===
Following the German invasion of the Low Countries on 10 May 1940, all units were soon in action, but the fortunes of war resulted in evacuation from Dunkirk, Cherbourg, Saint-Malo and other ports during late May and early June. One troop successfully brought back four of its 3.7-inch guns and some vital gunnery instruments, despite having orders to blow them up.

=== Blitz ===
AA units returning from France were rapidly reinforced, re-equipped where possible, and redeployed for future integration into existing defence plans. 8th HAA with 21, 22 and 23 Btys under command went to Blackpool where it re-equipped with 3.7-inch guns. The regiment was soon in action again during the Battle of Britain and the Blitz, first in Coventry, then ordered to London (Clapham Common) three days before Coventry was blitzed, the units road convoy took two hours to pass Green Road Roundabout on the outskirts of Oxford, such was its size, London and then on Teesside.

On 15 October 1940 5th LAA Bty left to join 2nd LAA Rgt, which was being formed at Aldershot. At the beginning of 1941 the regiment supplied a cadre of experienced officers and men to help form a new 414th HAA Bty at 210th HAA Training Rgt at Oswestry. This was formed on 16 January and joined 8th HAA Rgt on 25 March 1941. On 19 December 1941 414th HAA Bty left, briefly joining a series of other regiments until it went to the newly-formed 146th HAA Rgt, with which it remained until the end of the war.

=== Burma ===
In the spring of 1942, the regiment with 21st, 22n dead 23rd HAA Btys embarked for the Far East in the Belfast-built liner RMS Britannic, and after a long voyage, escorted for a long way by battleships HMS Rodney, HMS Nelson & HMS Valiant at different times, reached Bombay. The guns and equipment were unloaded at Karachi and both elements assembled at Lahore before driving some 2,000 miles in convoy down the Grand Trunk Road to Calcutta. It was later transferred to East Bengal, before moving south to join XV Corps in Burma.

For the next two and a half years. the regiment took part in the Arakan campaigns, firing effectively against the Japanese Air Force and ground targets. Their accuracy at long range earned them the nickname “The Twelve Mile Snipers.” Some elements took part in the famous Battle of the Admin Box at Ngakyedouk (“Okeydoke”) Pass. Several officers and men received awards for gallantry following this heroic stand, which proved to be the turning point in the Arakan. At Easter 1945, a tablet to the memory of members of the regiment who died in the Arakan was unveiled in St. Mark’s Church, Akyab. This little, battle-torn church was one of the first in all Burma to be retaken, and men of the regiment assisted in restoring the building.

== Postwar ==
When the war ended, the regiment was fortunate to embark at Madras as a unit, instead of being dispersed in age groups as was the common practice, and returned home to Ulster in another Belfast-built ship, RMS Stirling Castle. In 1946 the Regiment was placed in suspended animation.

=== 56 HAA Regiment ===
On 1 April 1947, the remainder of 8th HAA Rgt with its wartime personnel, then stationed at Coventry, was redesignated 56 Heavy Anti-Aircraft Regiment, RA in the Regular Army. The three SR batteries were disbanded and their personnel used to reform Regular batteries from suspended animation:

- 21st HAA Bty to resuscitate 54 Bty of 51/54 Field Bty as 136 HAA Bty
- 22nd HAA Bty to resuscitate 55 Bty of 36/55 Field Bty as 139 HAA Bty
- 23rd HAA Bty to resuscitate 57 Bty of 5/57 Field Bty as 144 HAA Bty

The new regiment formed part of 13 AA Bde in 5 AA Group.

In May 1948, when RHQ, 136 and 139 Btys were stationed at Newport, Wales and 144 Bty at Pembroke, they were reduced to cadre strength, but this was only administrative and they were resuscitated four days later. In 1953 the regiment was stationed at High Leigh Hall Camp at Knutsford. The regiment and batteries passed into suspended animation on 31 October 1958, and the batteries were formally disbanded on 1 January 1962.

=== 245 (Belfast) HAA Regiment ===
When the TA was reformed across the whole of the UK on 1 January 1947 many of the officers and men who had served in the old SR regiment came together again, and so helped to perpetuate the regimental spirit in a new unit, 245 (Belfast) (Mixed) Heavy Anti-Aircraft Regiment, RA (TA), with headquarters once again in Belfast. 'Mixed' indicated that women of the Auxiliary Territorial Service (ATS) and later Women's Royal Army Corps (WRAC) were integrated into the unit. 245 HAA Regiment was considered the successor to 8th (Belfast) HAA Regiment, even though that unit continued in existence manned by wartime personnel (soon to become the regular 56 HAA Rgt). The new 245 HAA Rgt formed part of part of 51 (Ulster) AA Bde in Northern Ireland District.

When AA Command was abolished on 10 March 1955, there was a wholesale reduction in the number of TA AA units. 245 HAA Regiment was amalgamated with the four other regiments of 51 (Ulster) AA Bde:

- 246 (Derry) (Mixed) HAA Rgt
- 247 (Ulster) LAA/Searchlight Rgt
- 248 (Ulster) LAA Rgt
- 502 (Ulster) HAA Rgt

The combined unit was due to be designated 434 Rgt, but in the event the number of the senior regiment was used instead, and it became 245 (Ulster) Light Anti-Aircraft Regiment, RA (TA):

- RHQ and P Bty – ex 245 and 247 Rgts
- Q Bty – ex 248 Rgt
- R Bty – ex 502 Rgt

In 1964 the unit was redesignated as 245 (Ulster) Light Air Defence Regiment, RA (TA). It formed part of 41 Army Group Royal Artillery.

When the TA was reduced into the Territorial and Army Volunteer Reserve (TAVR) in 1967, the regiment was amalgamated with 445 (Lowland) Light Air Defence Regiment, RA (TA) to form RHQ and 206 (Ulster) Battery Royal Artillery (Volunteers) of 102nd (Ulster and Scottish) Light Air Defence Regiment, RA (TAVR). In 1986 the Scottish batteries were removed to form a separate 105 (Scottish) LAD Rgt. 102 LAD Regiment was disbanded under Options for Change in 1993, but 206 Bty continues as 206 (Coleraine) Battery in 105th Regiment Royal Artillery (The Scottish & Ulster Gunners). It is one of the most efficient units of the Army Reserve today.

== Bibliography ==
- Richard Doherty, The Sons of Ulster: Ulstermen at War from the Somme to Korea, Belfast: Appletree Press, 192.
- Richard Doherty, Ubique: The Royal Artillery in the Second World War, Stroud: History Press, 2009.
- Gen Sir Martin Farndale, History of the Royal Regiment of Artillery: The Years of Defeat: Europe and North Africa, 1939–1941, Woolwich: Royal Artillery Institution, 1988/London: Brasseys, 1996, ISBN 1857530802.
- J.B.M. Frederick, Lineage Book of British Land Forces 1660–1978, Vol II, Wakefield: Microform Academic, 1984, ISBN 1-85117-009-X.
- Lt-Col H.F. Joslen, Orders of Battle, United Kingdom and Colonial Formations and Units in the Second World War, 1939–1945, London: HM Stationery Office, 1960/London: London Stamp Exchange, 1990, ISBN 0-948130-03-2/Uckfield: Naval & Military Press, 2003, ISBN 1-843424-74-6.
- Litchfield, Norman E H, 1992. The Territorial Artillery 1908-1988, The Sherwood Press, Nottingham. ISBN 0-9508205-2-0
- Brig N.W. Routledge, History of the Royal Regiment of Artillery: Anti-Aircraft Artillery 1914–55, London: Royal Artillery Institution/Brassey's, 1994, ISBN 1-85753-099-3
