= 3rd (Ulster) Searchlight Regiment, Royal Artillery =

3rd (Ulster) Searchlight Regiment, RA 4th (Ulster) Light Anti-Aircraft Regiment, RA 247 (Ulster) LAA/SL Regiment, RA 248 (Ulster) LAA Regiment, RA
- Royal Artillery cap badge
- Active: 1 September 1939–10 March 1955
- Country: United Kingdom
- Branch: Supplementary Reserve
- Type: Searchlight; Light AA
- Role: Air Defence
- Size: 3–4 Batteries
- Part of: British Expeditionary Force; Anti-Aircraft Command; 21st Army Group
- Garrison/HQ: Belfast
- Engagements: Battle of France; Dunkirk evacuation North West Europe; Defence of Brussels

The 3rd (Ulster) Searchlight Regiment (3rd (Ulster) S/L Rgt) was a Supplementary Reserve (SR) unit of the Royal Artillery raised in Northern Ireland just before the outbreak of World War II. It distinguished itself in the Battle of France before being evacuated from Dunkirk. It then served in Anti-Aircraft Command, converting into the 4th (Ulster) Light Anti-Aircraft Regiment (4th Ulster LAA Rgt) in 1942. In that role it served in the campaign in North West Europe, defending Brussels against V-1 flying bombs. It was reformed postwar and its successor units continued to serve in the Territorial Army (TA) until 1993.

== 3rd (Ulster) Searchlight Regiment ==
The regiment was formed on 1 September 1939 while Anti-Aircraft Command was being mobilised for World War II. As a Supplementary Reserve (SR) unit it was numbered immediately after the two Regular Army S/L regiments, rather than in the numerical sequence of the TA units that comprised the rest of AA Command. It was assigned to 3rd AA Brigade (SR), defending Belfast, and was organised as follows: (Note: When the Territorial Force (TF) was created in 1908 it did not extend to Ireland (neither had its predecessor, the Volunteer Force). The only auxiliary military force in Ireland was the Special Reserve, derived from the old Militia. When the TF's successor, the Territorial Army (TA) was being rapidly expanded in the months before the outbreak of World War II, the established mechanism in Northern Ireland was the Special Reserve's successor, the Supplementary Reserve (SR), even though its units were moribund in the rest of the UK.)

- Regimental Headquarters (RHQ) at Belfast
- 9 Searchlight Battery at Clonaver, Strandtown
- 10 S/L Bty at Belfast
- 11 S/L Bty at Belfast
- 12 S/L Bty at Lurgan

The establishment of a S/L battery at this time was four troops, each of six 'projectors', making a total of 24 per battery, 96 per regiment. Each S/L site was also equipped with Light machine guns (usually Lewis guns) for local defence.

=== Battle of France ===
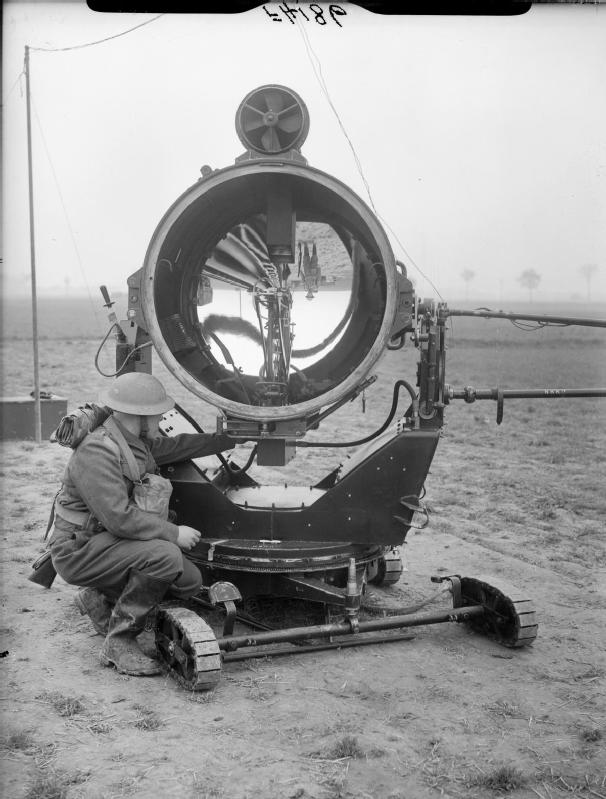
90 cm Searchlight of 10 S/L Bty, 3rd (Ulster) S/L Rgt, in France, May 1940.

Unlike the TA, the primary role of the SR was to supplement Regular Army units. In November 1939 3rd S/L Rgt moved from Northern Ireland to Bordon Camp in Hampshire, and on 25 December it sailed from Southampton to join the British Expeditionary Force forming in France. It deployed round the La Hutte and Béthune areas, initially under 2nd AA Brigade and then under a new 5th S/L Bde in March 1940. The regiment received its '(Ulster)' subtitle on 8 May 1940.

When the Phoney War ended with the German invasion of the Low Countries on 10 May 1940, the regiment under the command of Lieutenant-Colonel F.C. Wallace was deployed as follows:

- 9 S/L Bty at Lens
- 10 S/L Bty at Carvin
- 11 S/L Bty at Richarderie
- 12 S/L Bty at Dunkirk

The three inland batteries were deployed in Gun Defence Areas (GDAs) between Béthune and Lille to assist the heavy AA (HAA guns) against night air raids by the Luftwaffe. 9 S/L Battery (as well as 8 S/L Bty of 2nd S/L Rgt) was supporting two batteries of 2nd Heavy AA Rgt in the Arras GDA. The battery on the coast at Dunkirk had two roles: AA defence of the town, and detection of aircraft attempting to drop Parachute mines in the approaches to the harbour.

All of 3rd S/L Rgt's batteries were in action from the start of the campaign on 10 May, engaging low-flying attackers with LMGs by day, and illuminating bombers at night. Dunkirk was heavily attacked. After about three days, the Luftwaffe switched its attacks to airfields, and to boost their defences the three batteries round Lille were split up among the airfields in a dual Light AA (LAA) and SL role to boost the defences with extra machine guns. When the tanks of Army Group A cut through south of the BEF, 9 S/L Bty was rushed down to Arras to dig in and defend the perimeter with roadblocks.

Battle of France, situation map 21 May–4 June.

By now the regiment was scattered in sub-units from Vimy Ridge to Arras, but on 19 May it was ordered to move back to Dunkirk in independent groups. The larger 150 cm S/L projectors had to be disabled and abandoned because there was no means of extricating them in the chaotic road conditions with the few vehicles available. By 21 May, 9, 10 and 11 S/L Btys were in position for ground defence from Bergues to Gravelines along the outer line of canals covering the south-western approaches to the port, except for one party fighting a rearguard action with infantry near Blangy. 12 Searchlight Bty continued in its AA role in Dunkirk itself, in action against bombers and minelayers.

On 23 May enemy troops bumped into positions held by 11 S/L Bty and were driven off by concentrated small arms fire. On 24 May, as part of 'Usherforce' under Colonel C.M. Usher, 6th Battalion Green Howards with detachments of 3rd S/L Rgt defended the bridges at Gravelines and for three miles southwards. They held off all attempts by 1st Panzer Division to seize the bridges until they were relieved by French troops later in the day. 11 Searchlight Bty was also attacked by tanks; they called down French artillery support, but much of the defensive fire fell short, making their positions untenable. Further east, the enemy confronting 10 S/L Bty had tank and artillery support, and the S/L detachment was driven back into Uxem. From Uxem it sent north to hold a canal entrance bridge and to man a small number of S/L projectors to illuminate the front against night attack – the first recorded use of this technique during the war.

By now the decision had been made to evacuate the BEF through Dunkirk (Operation Dynamo). 3rd Searchlight Rgt took command of 173 LAA Bty with two Trps, detached from their parent regiment 58th (Argyll & Sutherland Highlanders) LAA Rgt, which had fought their way into the Dunkirk perimeter from Douai. They set up their guns on the beaches that were being used for evacuation and now came under sustained air attack. On 27 May, 9, 10 and 11 S/L Btys were relieved by infantry, destroyed any remaining equipment and pulled back to the beaches for evacuation. 12 S/L Battery remained in action in Dunkirk under shellfire. While the rest of the regiment was being evacuated it was ordered to send a party to Veurne, about 10 miles (16 km) away on the Belgian border, and hold it against ground attack. They held it for 36 hours until relieved by a company of the Guards. The detachment then made its way back along the beaches to Dunkirk where the battery was concentrated and taken off by boat late on 31 May.

In three weeks of fighting, two of them in an infantry role, 3rd (Ulster) S/L Rgt had lost 28 men killed, 41 wounded and 3 taken prisoner.

=== Home Defence ===
On arrival in England, 3rd S/L Rgt was immediately re-equipped and returned to AA Command. During the Blitz of 1940–41 it formed part of 64th AA Bde, whose role was to provide S/L and light AA (LAA) gun cover to Royal Air Force (RAF) airfields in South West England.

The regiment supplied a cadre of experienced officers and men to 237th S/L Training Rgt at Holywood, County Down, where it provided the basis for a new 533 S/L Bty formed on 14 November 1940. This battery later joined 87th S/L Rgt.

3rd (Ulster) S/L Rgt remained with 64th AA Bde until the end of 1941.

== 4th (Ulster) Light Anti-Aircraft Regiment ==
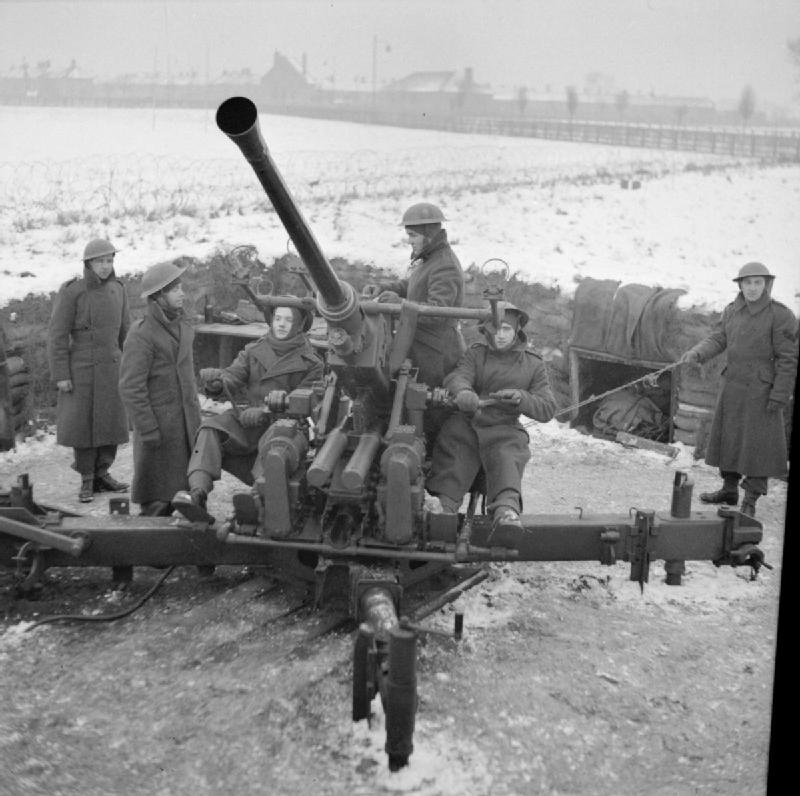
A Bofors crew undergoing training in early 1942.

After its rapid expansion, AA Command was now over-provided with S/L units and under-provided with LAA units, for which suitable guns (the Bofors 40 mm) were becoming available in quantity. The command began a programme of converting some S/L regiments to the LAA role. One of those chosen was 3rd S/L Rgt, which became 4th (Ulster) Light Anti-Aircraft Regiment (Note: Once again, as an SR regiment, it was numbered after the Regulars, not in the TA and war-raised sequence.) on 21 January 1942. The four S/L batteries – 9, 10, 11, 12 – became 7, 10, 11 and 8 LAA Btys respectively. At first the new regiment remained unbrigaded in AA Command, then in June–July 1942 it was assigned with 7, 9 and 10 LAA Btys to 37th AA Bde, controlling the 'Thames North' AA layout on the Essex shore of the Thames Estuary. 11 LAA Battery was transferred to 120th LAA Rgt on 10 July, moving on to help form a new 144th LAA Rgt later in the year. By October the regiment was unbrigaded again, then it briefly joined 27th (Home Counties) AA Bde covering the naval base of Portsmouth, but left about the end of November to rejoin 5th AA Bde now covering Gloucester and Hereford.

=== North West Europe ===
4th (Ulster) LAA Rgt left AA Command in April 1943 and became part of 21st Army Group, training for the planned Allied invasion of Normandy (Operation Overlord). It was designated as a semi-mobile unit under GHQ and Line of Communication Troops.

After 'Overlord' was launched on D Day, 6 June 1944, 21st Army Group's AA formations and units were progressively fed into the beachhead. The HQ and advanced units of 101st AA Bde began landing in the American sector on 19/20 August to take over defence of Cherbourg Naval Base. Two weeks later, the breakout from the beachhead having been achieved, 101st AA Bde handed over its commitments at Cherbourg and drove to Brussels, where from 12 September it deployed 4th (Ulster) LAA Rgt, 116th HAA Rgt and 474 S/L Bty.

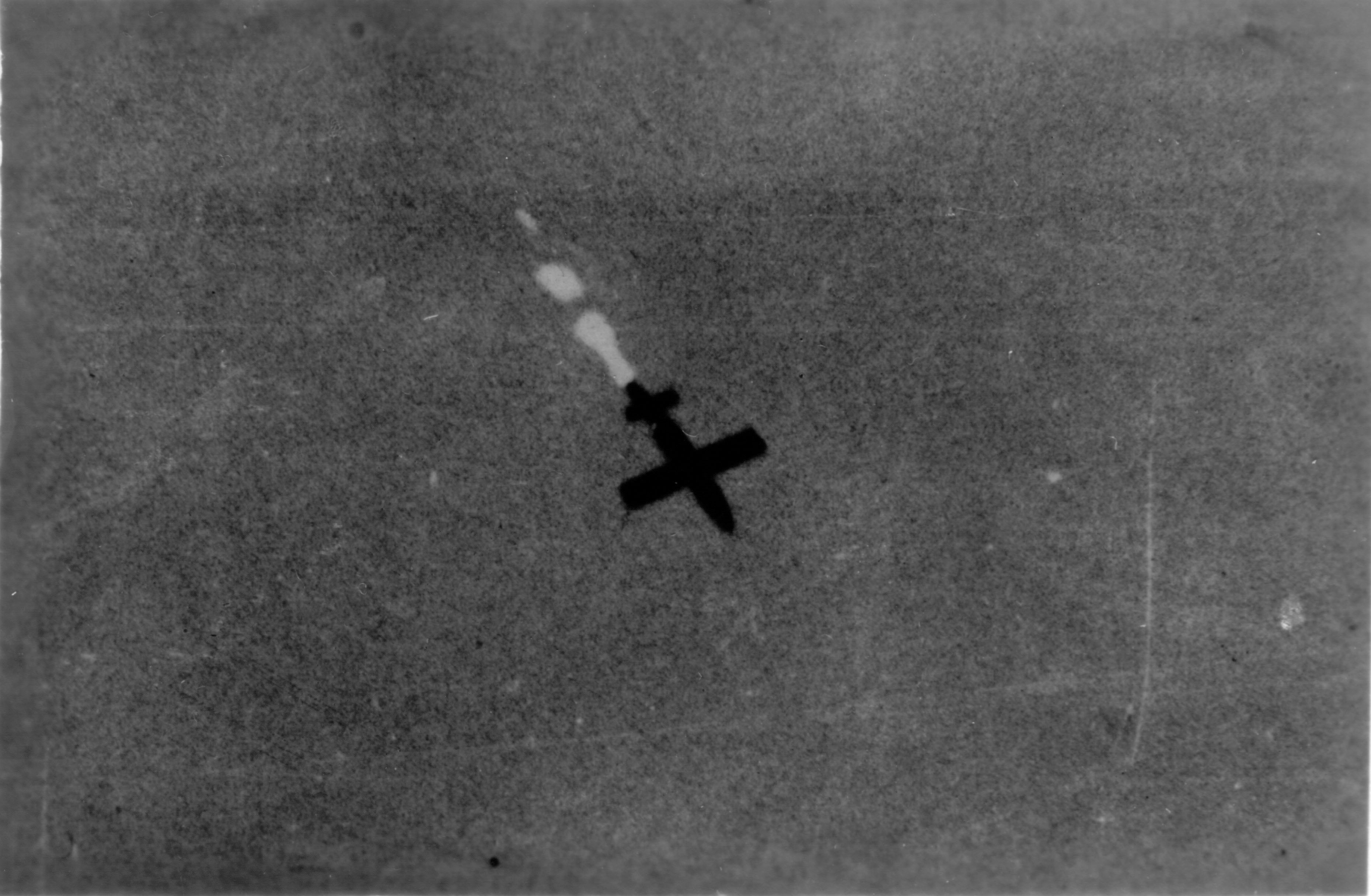
V-1 in flight over Antwerp

At first, the AA units at Brussels were deployed to defend the liberated city against conventional piloted aircraft, but the air situation was quiet until 21 October. On that day the first V-1 flying bombs (codenamed 'Divers') began hitting the city. Given the experience of the V-1 campaign against London during the summer, this had been anticipated, and since September an 'X' defence layout had been planned for both Brussels and Antwerp. The planned redeployments were immediately carried out. They consisted of a line of Wireless Observer Units some 40 miles (64 km) to 50 miles (80 km) miles out to give 8 minutes' warning of a missile's approach, an intermediate zone of radar-equipped Local Warning Stations, and an inner belt of observation posts about 20,000 yards (18,000 m) yards in front of the guns to give visual confirmation that the tracked target was a missile. The gunsites were positioned in an arc at least 10 miles (16 km) from the city, so that 'downed' missiles did not land within it. The small, fast-moving missiles were difficult to hit, but the success rate of the guns progressively increased. The 'Diver X' defences were essentially completed by December, though the proportion of HAA guns was increased and the radars were improved. The only alteration in the LAA deployment was to move the guns further east, away from the target city. There was a sharp decline in the numbers of V-1s launched against Brussels after December 1944, and the LAA guns were then switched to defending airfields.

In late March 1945 21st Army Group carried out an assault crossing of the Rhine (Operation Plunder). 101st AA Brigade was then brought forward on 14 April to provide AA defence for the vital bridges over the River Maas and those that the Royal Engineers were building across the Rhine. Two batteries of 4th LAA Rgt were among the seven that were deployed at the Rhine bridges from 16 April. 21st Army Group advanced rapidly across North Germany, and the German surrender at Lüneburg Heath followed on 4 May.

== Postwar ==
=== 30 LAA Regiment ===
On 1 January 1947, 4th (Ulster) LAA Rgt passed into suspended animation and the personnel then serving in the regiment were transferred to a new 4th LAA Rgt in the Regular Army. On 1 April 1947 this was redesignated 30 LAA Regiment with the following organisation: (Note: The previous 30th LAA Rgt was a TA unit that had reformed as 530 (Essex) LAA Rgt.)

- 7 LAA Bty – disbanded to resuscitate 26 Bty unlinked from 25/26 Medium Bty in 7th Medium Rgt as 76 LAA Bty
- 8 LAA Bty – disbanded to resuscitate 17 Bty unlinked from 15/17 Medium Bty in 5th Medium Rgt as 77 LAA Bty
- 10 LAA Bty – disbanded to resuscitate 12 Bty from 8/12 Medium Bty in 2nd Medium Rgt as 85 LAA Bty

30 LAA Regiment, equipped with Bofors guns, formed part of 1 AA Bde in AA Command's 1 AA Group. It was converted into 30 HAA Regiment equipped with 3.7-inch guns on 1 September 1948, and in 1949 was stationed at Dover. By March 1950 it was serving in British Army of the Rhine (BAOR), stationed at Vancouver Barracks, Delmenhorst as part of 5 Army Group Royal Artillery. On 20 January 1958 76 Bty transferred to 24th Medium Rgt and the rest of the regiment had passed into suspended animation by the end of the month.

=== 247 and 248 (Ulster) LAA Regiments ===
On 1 January 1947 the former Supplementary Reserve regiment was reformed (now in the Territorial Army) as two regiments designated 247 (Ulster) LAA Regiment (regarded as successor to 3rd S/L Rgt) and 248 (Ulster) LAA Regiment (successor to 4th LAA Rgt). 247 was redesignated as an LAA/SL regiment on 16 March 1949. Both regiments were based at Belfast and formed part of 51 (Ulster) AA Bde.

When AA Command was abolished on 10 March 1955 there were wholesale disbandments and amalgamations among its units: 247 LAA/SL and 248 LAA regiments, together with other units in Northern Ireland, were merged into 245 (Belfast) HAA Regiment to form 245 (Ulster) LAA Regiment. From 1967 this formed part of 102 (Ulster) Light Air Defence Rgt until its disbandment in 1993.

== Insignia ==
During World War II, 3rd (Ulster) S/L Rgt wore an arm badge comprising the Red Hand of Ulster on an upright Khaki rectangle, and this was continued after the war by 247 (Ulster) LAA/SL Rgt. Postwar, in common with the other units in 51 (Ulster) AA Bde, 247 and 248 Rgts wore a supplementary shoulder title of 'ULSTER' embroidered in RA red on dark blue, worn on battledress blouses beneath the standard RA title.

== External sources ==
- British Army units from 1945 on
- Orders of Battle at Patriot Files
- Graham Watson, The Territorial Army 1947
- WW2Talk
