= 28th (Essex) Searchlight Regiment, Royal Artillery =

28th (Essex) Anti-Aircraft Battalion, RE 28th (Essex) Searchlight Regiment, RA 630th (Essex) Infantry Regiment, RA 563 (28th Essex) Searchlight Regiment, RA
- Active: 1935–1955
- Country: United Kingdom
- Branch: Territorial Army
- Type: Searchlight Regiment
- Role: Air Defence
- Size: Regiment
- Garrison/HQ: Brentwood, Essex
- Engagements: The Blitz; Operation Diver; Operation Doomsday

The 28th (Essex) Searchlight Regiment was a volunteer air defence unit of Britain's Territorial Army (TA) from 1935 until 1961, at first as part of the Royal Engineers, later in the Royal Artillery. During the Second World War it defended the approaches to London in The Blitz and Operation Diver before becoming a garrison unit in the liberation of Norway.

== Origin ==
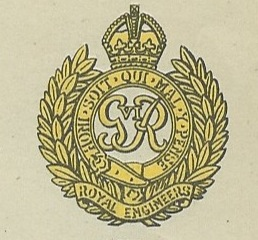
Cap badge of the Royal Engineers (cipher of King George VI).

The regiment had its origins in a group of Independent Air Defence Companies of the Royal Engineers formed in Essex by the Territorial Army in during January 1925, organised as follows:

Essex Group Anti-Aircraft Searchlight Companies:

- HQ at Chestnut Grove, Brentwood
- 309 (Essex) AA Company at Harlow, later Horns Road, Newbury Park, Ilford
- 310 (Essex) AA Company at Epping
- 311 (Essex) AA Company at Brentwood
- 312 (Essex) AA Company at Hornchurch, later Upminster

Recruitment was slow to begin with, and hampered by lack of accommodation. To start with, 310 Company at Epping only had a rented garage at a hotel as its HQ, and in April 1925 the Army Council gained authorisation from HM Treasury to purchase a building that could be converted into a proper drill hall, shared by the AASL company and the Epping company of the Essex Regiment. The Army Council considered that proper accommodation was essential to recruiting the units to full establishment, and in November the same year it gained authorisation to extend the existing infantry drill hall at Brentwood for the Essex AA Group HQ, as well as the Company HQ and one section of 311 Company. Two years later, the Army Council gained funding for new accommodation at Hornchurch, where the infantry company had dwindled to one man, but 312 AASL company required more space and a proper lorry shed, and a new building at Ongar for a section of 310 Company, which was recruiting well.

On 15 December 1935, the Essex Group became 28th Anti-Aircraft Battalion, Royal Engineers (TA), and the following year it was subordinated to the newly formed 29th (East Anglian) Anti-Aircraft Group (later termed a Brigade), based at RAF North Weald in Essex and part of 1st Anti-Aircraft Division. In the years before the Second World War, British anti-aircraft defences continued to expand, with new regiments and formations, the whole coming under Anti-Aircraft Command. In April 1939, 310 (Essex) Company was split off to form part of the new 74th (Essex Fortress) AA Bn.

== Second World War ==
=== Mobilisation ===
90 cm 'Projector Anti-Aircraft', displayed at Fort Nelson, Portsmouth.

The TA's AA units were mobilised on 23 September 1938 during the Munich Crisis, with units manning their emergency positions within 24 hours, even though many did not yet have their full complement of men or equipment. The emergency lasted three weeks, and they were stood down on 13 October. In June 1939, as the international situation worsened, a partial mobilisation of the TA was begun in a process known as 'couverture', whereby each AA unit did a month's tour of duty in rotation to man selected AA gun and searchlight positions. On 24 August, ahead of the declaration of war, AA Command was fully mobilised at its war stations.

28 AA Battalion's company HQs were distributed as follows:

- 309: Bishops Moat, Lambourne, mobilisation store at Romford
- 311: Cricketer's Arms, Danbury, mobilisation store at Warley
- 312: Boyce Hill, South Benfleet, mobilisation store at Pitsea

When war was declared on 3 September 1939, 28 AA Bn was still in 29 AA Bde, but this had been transferred to 6th AA Division which was formed in 1939 to take responsibility for air defence of the Thames Estuary, Essex and Kent.

=== The Blitz ===
RA cap badge.

In common with other RE searchlight battalions, the unit was transferred to Royal Artillery in August 1940, becoming 28th (Essex) Searchlight Regiment RA (TA), and the companies were termed batteries. At this time, AA Command was heavily engaged in the Battle of Britain, in which 29 AA Bde was responsible for guarding Kent. This was soon followed by the night-bombing campaign of The Blitz, in which searchlights were a key element in the defences.

As of 1 November 1941, the regimental and battery HQs were distributed as follows:

- RHQ: The Drill Hall, Chestnut Grove, Brentwood (CO: Lt-Col E.C. Adam, MC)
- 309 Bty: RA Camp, Boyton Cross, near Chelmsford (Officer Commanding (OC): Maj A.L. Jones, MC)
- 311 Bty: RA Camp, Little Gibcracks, Danbury (OC: Maj F.R.F. Holt)
- 312 Bty: Windmill Guest House, Copford, near Colchester (OC: Maj G.H. Wybrow)

In November 1940, all S/Ls in 29 AA Bde's area, except the coastal sites, had been 'clustered' in threes at 10,400-yard intervals. The cluster system was an attempt to improve the chances of picking up enemy bombers and keeping them illuminated for engagement by AA guns or Night fighters. Eventually, one light in each cluster was to be equipped with searchlight control (SLC) radar and act as a 'master light', but the radar equipment was still in short supply.

The regiment supplied a cadre of experienced officers and men to 231st S/L Training Rgt at Blandford Camp where it provided the basis for a new 546 S/L Bty formed on 16 January 1941. This battery later joined a newly-forming 90th S/L Rgt.

=== Mid-War ===
6 AA Division formation badge, worn 1941–42.

By October 1941, the availability of SLC radar was sufficient to allow AA Command's S/Ls to be 'declustered' into single-light sites spaced at 10,400-yard intervals in 'Indicator Belts' along the coast and 'Killer Belts' at 6,000-yard spacing to cooperate with the RAF's Night-fighters. 29th AA Brigade deployed 90 mm S/Ls in the indicator belt and 150 mm S/Ls in the killer belt, while a mixture of 90 mm and 120 mm lights were deployed in the Harwich Gun Defence Area, spaced at 10,400 yards in the inner zone and 6,000 yards in the outer. All these S/L sites were manned by 28th S/L Rgt and by 328 and 330 Btys of 32nd (7th City of London) S/L Rgt.

In January 1942, the regiment was joined by 438 S/L Bty, transferred from 63rd (Queen's) S/L Rgt in 1 AA Division, which was about to be converted into a Light AA (LAA) gun unit.

6 AA Division was reorganised in the winter of 1941-42. As a result, 29 AA Brigade was disbanded on 14 February 1942 and the bulk of its responsibilities, including 28th S/L Rgt, were transferred to 37 AA Bde, which controlled the AA defences along the north side of the Thames Estuary. At the same time 438 S/L Battery came under the operational control of 56 AA Bde on the south side of the estuary. Then, in June, the whole of 28th S/L Rgt came under the command of 56 AA Bde, which now controlled all the S/L units south of the estuary.

There was another shake-up of AA Command at the beginning of October 1942, when the AA Divisions were replaced by AA Groups having a wider remit. 28th S/L Regiment was now in 2 AA Group covering South East England, but by early November it had moved to 47 AA Bde.

This organisation remained in place until 1944, but by late 1943, AA Command was being forced to release manpower for overseas service, particularly Operation Overlord (the Allied invasion of Normandy) and most S/L regiments lost one of their four batteries. In October, 28th S/L Rgt amalgamated 309 and 311 Btys into a composite 309/311 S/L Bty. 47 AA Brigade itself was disbanded in June 1944 and 28th S/L Rgt transferred within 2 AA Group to 38 AA Bde.

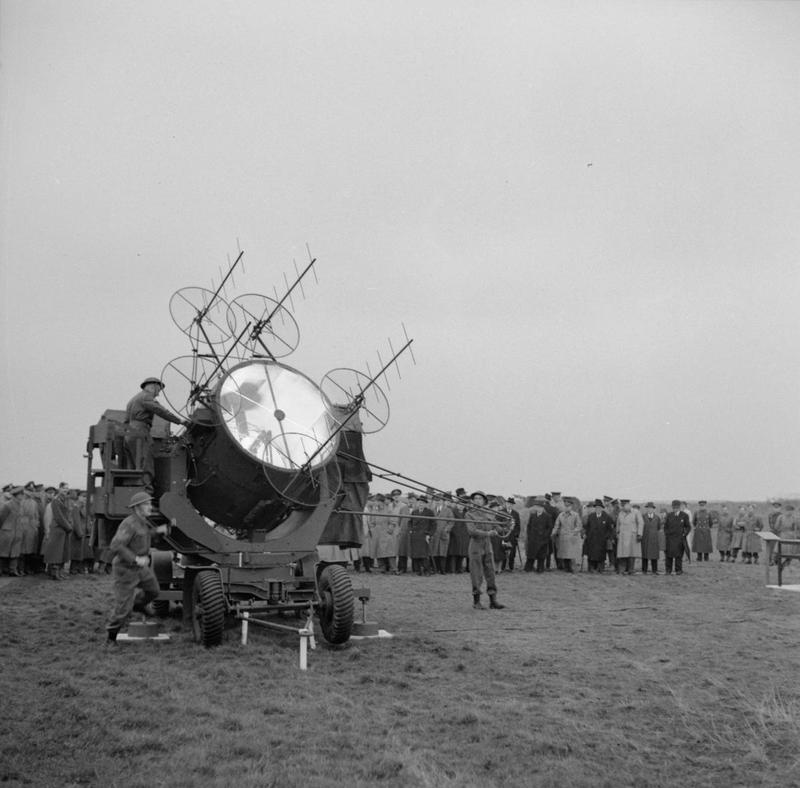
150 cm Searchlight equipped with No 2 Mk VI SLC ('Elsie').

Soon after D Day, the Germans began launching V-1 flying bombs against London by day and night. The AA resources in SE England were strongly reinforced in Operation Diver, but the LAA batteries found these small, fast-moving targets hard to engage. Searchlight units used their SLC radar to help guide the LAA guns. In August 1944, 38 AA Bde came under the command of 6 AA Group, an HQ brought in from Scotland to relieve the overstretched command structure in SE England during Operation Diver.

=== 630th (Essex) Infantry Regiment, RA ===
By the end of 1944, however, the German Luftwaffe was suffering from such shortages of pilots, aircraft and fuel that serious aerial attacks on the United Kingdom could be discounted. At the same time, 21st Army Group fighting in North West Europe was suffering a severe manpower shortage, particularly among the infantry. In January 1945, the War Office began to reorganise surplus anti-aircraft and coastal artillery regiments in the UK into infantry battalions, primarily for line of communication and occupation duties, thereby releasing trained infantry for front line service. 28th Searchlight Regiment was one of the units selected for conversion, and redesignated 630th (Essex) Infantry Regiment, RA in 38 AA Bde, which became 304th Infantry Brigade on 22 January 1945.

On 13 February 1945, the surplus (older or unfit) men were sent to Bursledon, near Southampton, where 82nd S/L Rgt was acting as a holding unit. The former 28th S/L Rgt men constituted 510 S/L Bty within the regiment while they were awaiting posting or demobilisation. The regiment's Auxiliary Territorial Service (ATS) women were posted to AA brigade HQs.

After infantry training, including a short period attached to 55th (West Lancashire) Infantry Division, 630 Regiment was sent to Norway in June 1945 to disarm German forces following the liberation of that country (Operation Doomsday).

== Postwar ==
After the end of the Second World War, the regiment was placed in suspended animation in 1946 before being reconstituted the following year as 563 Searchlight Regiment, RA (28th Essex). Its HQ was at Whipps Cross, Essex, and once again it formed part of 29 AA Bde, now renumbered 55 (East Anglian) AA Bde. Two years later, the regiment's role was partly changed and it was redesignated 563 (Mixed) Light Anti-Aircraft/Searchlight Regiment RA (28th Essex), 'Mixed' indicating that some of the personnel were from the Women's Royal Army Corps.

When AA Command was disbanded on 10 March 1955, the regiment amalgamated with a number of other Essex AA units to form 517th LAA Regiment (5th Essex), with the former 28th Essex becoming R Battery. In 1961, a further amalgamation into 300 LAA Regiment (Finsbury Rifles) finally ended the 28th Essex lineage.

== External sources ==
- British Army units from 1945 on
- British Military History
- The Drill Hall Project
- Orders of Battle at Patriot Files
- The Royal Artillery 1939–45
- Graham Watson, The Territorial Army 1947
