= 114th Light Anti-Aircraft Regiment, Royal Artillery =

91st Searchlight Regiment, RA 114th Light Anti-Aircraft Regiment, RA
- Royal Artillery cap badge
- Active: April 1941 – 12 January 1942 (91st S/L); 12 January 1942 – 16 June 1945 (114th LAA)
- Country: United Kingdom
- Branch: British Army
- Role: Air Defence
- Size: Regiment
- Part of: 80th AA Brigade
- Engagements: D-Day; Defence of the Orne Bridges; Liberation of Rouen; Defence of Antwerp

Commanders
- Notable commanders: Lt-Col Nigel Hoare

The 114th Light Anti-Aircraft Regiment (114th LAA Rgt), was an air defence unit of the British Army's Royal Artillery during World War II. It landed on D-Day and saw action throughout the campaign in North West Europe, defending the vital port of Antwerp against Parachute mines and V-1 flying bombs.

== Origin ==
The regiment was formed in January 1942 from the short-lived 91st Searchlight Regiment, Royal Artillery which had only been raised in the previous March as part of the rapid expansion of Britain's Anti-Aircraft (AA) defences.

=== 91st Searchlight Regiment ===
91st S/L Regiment was formed in 3rd AA Brigade at Belfast in Northern Ireland. Regimental Headquarters (RHQ) was formed on 25 March 1941 at 3rd AA Bde's HQ at Orangefield House and began assembling in April at Rathgael House, Bangor, County Down, under the command of Lt-Col Nigel Hoare. It received a draft of newly commissioned officers from 133rd (AA) Officer Cadet Training Unit at Shrivenham, and in the first week of May the batteries (which had all been formed on 16 January) began arriving from various AA training regiments and were deployed to their sites; 552nd S/L Bty deployed directly from 237th S/L Training Rgt at nearby Holywood. The new unit had the following organisation:

- 549 S/L Bty, formed by 234th S/L Training Rgt at Carlisle from a cadre of experienced officers and men provided by 49th (The West Yorkshire Regiment) S/L Rgt
- 550 S/L Bty, formed by 235th S/L Training Rgt at Ayr, cadre from 38th (The King's Regiment) S/L Rgt
- 552 S/L Bty, formed by 237th S/L Training Rgt at Holywood, County Down, cadre from 45th (Royal Warwickshire Regiment) S/L Rgt
- 553 S/L Bty, formed by 238th S/L Training Rgt at Buxton, cadre from 43rd (5th Duke of Wellington's Regiment) S/L Rgt

Nigel Walter Hoare (1902–1988) was a member of the Hoare banking family and had been commissioned into the Essex Group AA Searchlight Companies, Royal Engineers, in the Territorial Army in 1925.

Belfast was raided several times while the regiment was forming (the Belfast Blitz); thereafter there were only rare incursions by enemy aircraft over Northern Ireland. The searchlights were deployed in clusters, but towards the end of 1941 this arrangement was changed, and the lights in Northern Ireland were redeployed singly to form a 'killer belt' to assist night-fighters. This system required fewer lights, and in November 1941 Anti-Aircraft Command decided that 91st S/L Rgt would be converted to the Light Anti-Aircraft (LAA) gun role. In December the batteries went to Holywood, where they were retrained by what was now 237th LAA Training Rgt, and surplus manpower was drafted to other units.

=== 114th Light Anti-Aircraft Regiment ===
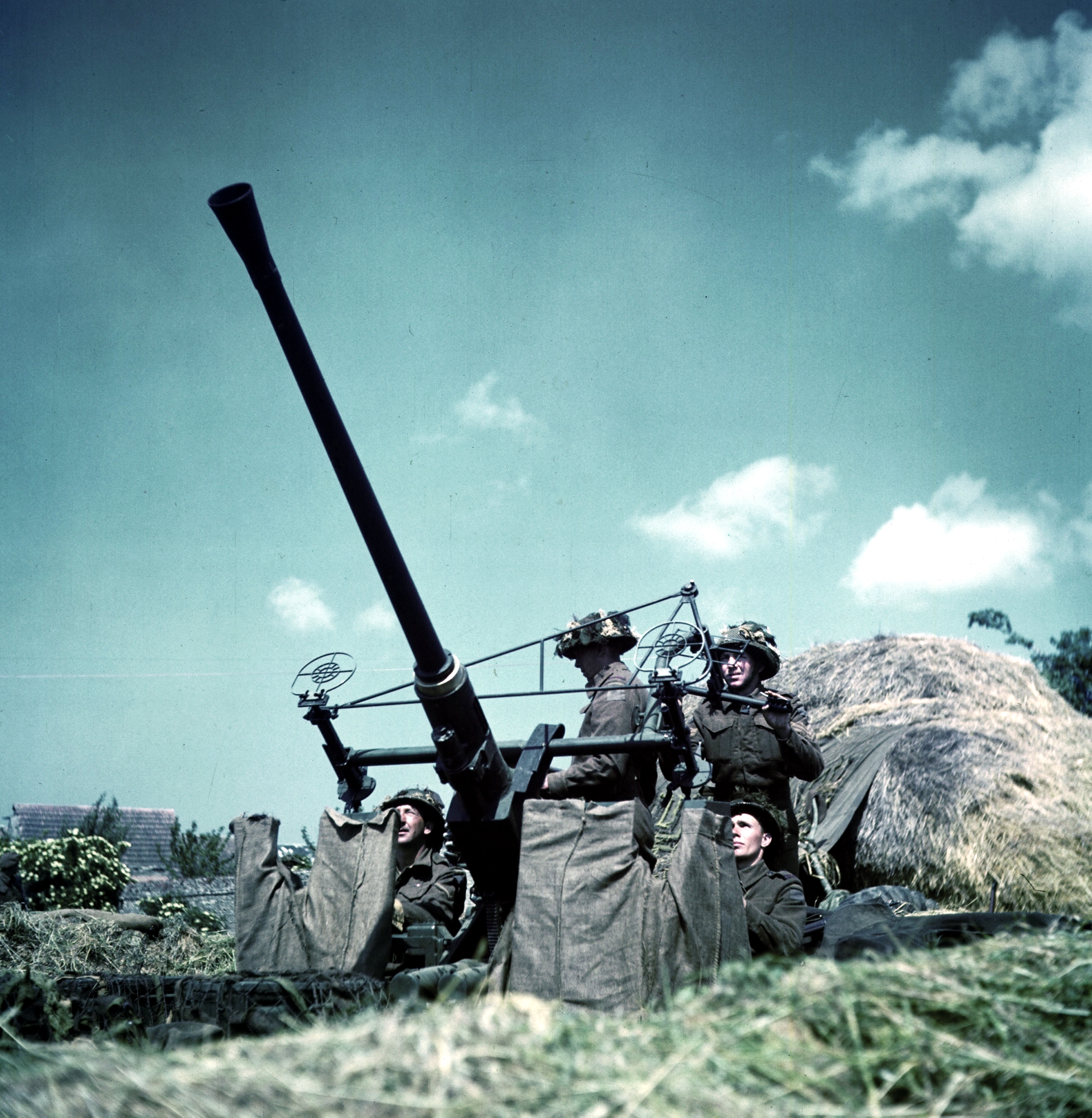
Bofors 40 mm LAA gun equipped with 'Stiffkey Stick' sights

The official conversion took place on 12 January 1942, when 549, 550, 552 and 553 S/L Btys were redesignated 372, 373, 374 and 375 LAA Btys respectively. After attending 17th LAA Practice Camp at Ballykinlar Camp, County Down, the new regiment, still under the command of Lt-Col Hoare, embarked for Fleetwood in Lancashire. Here it deployed to relieve 76th LAA Rgt at sites across Lancashire, with RHQ at Milnthorpe. The regiment was under the command of 70th AA Bde in 4th AA Division, but in May it transferred to 31st (North Midland) AA Bde of 10th AA Division in Yorkshire, with 372 Bty detached to 65th AA Bde covering Humberside. On the night of 29/30 May, assisted by searchlights, A Troop of 372 Bty at Grimsby engaged 13 enemy aircraft, and a detachment of C Trp at a site in Hull also engaged one aircraft.

In July 1942, 114th LAA Rgt provided a cadre of experienced men to form a new 483rd LAA Bty at 212th LAA Training Rgt at Saighton Camp, then on 6 October the whole of 374 LAA Bty left to join a new 142nd LAA Rgt that was being formed nearby at Lotherton Hall. The rest of 114th LAA Rgt's batteries handed their gunsites over to 142nd LAA Rgt and left for battle training.

== Mobile training ==
In July 1942, 114th had opened a regimental school for mobile LAA operations, but it was hampered by the lack of motor vehicles. In November and December that year the regiment underwent formal mobile training under 11th AA Bde at Leigh-on-Sea. It then moved to South Collingham in Nottinghamshire to take over operational commitments under 50th AA Bde.

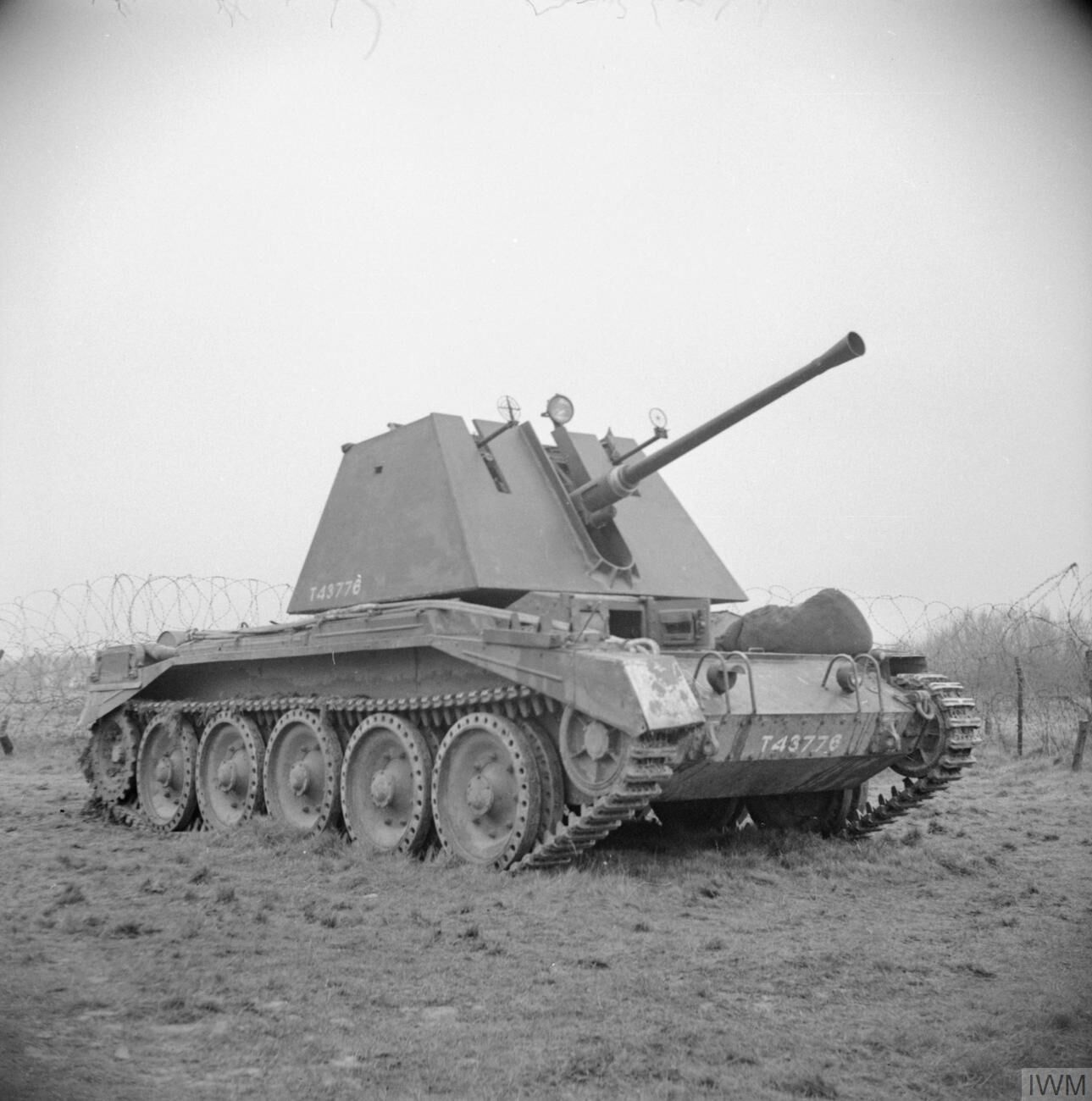
Crusader AA tank with Bofors gun

However, on 12 January 1943, the regiment was instructed to join 75th AA Bde at Ipswich. This was not part of AA Command but one of the mobile formations in Home Forces training for the planned invasion of Europe (Operation Overlord). The regiment began taking part in field training exercises in various parts of the country and was formally mobilised on 30 March. Each battery of a mobile LAA regiment consisted of three Troops equipped with six towed Bofors 40 mm guns using 'Stiffkey Stick' sights. The following month it came under the command of the newly formed 80th AA Brigade at Blandford Camp in Dorset. As a mobile unit, 114th LAA Rgt now had its own Royal Electrical and Mechanical Engineers (REME) workshop, which joined in May 1943.

The regiment established its HQ at Arthurlie Barracks at Barrhead in Scotland in July, to which it returned after periodic training exercises simulating assault landings on a hostile shore. Towards the end of 1943 the regiment moved to join 80th AA Bde HQ at Oxted and Limpsfield in Surrey. In December 1943–January 1944 it carried out user trials at No 16 AA Practice Camp at Clacton-on-Sea on self-propelled (SP) Bofors 40 mm guns mounted on Crusader tank chassis. In February 1944 it began to receive this new equipment.

By now, 80th AA Bde HQ and 114th LAA Rgt had moved to Southampton, and in April the regiment moved again to Stroud Park at Broadbridge Heath in West Sussex before going to its invasion marshalling areas in late May.

== D-Day ==
For the Normandy landings, 80th AA Brigade was assigned to support I Corps landing on Juno and Sword Beaches, while 76th AA Brigade supported XXX Corps on Gold Beach. The leading elements were to land with the assault waves on D-Day itself (6 June). Light AA defence was emphasised at the start of the operation, since low-level attack by Luftwaffe aircraft was considered the most likely threat. The LAA regiments involved in the initial landings were on minimum scales of equipment, to be brought up to strength by parties arriving later.

The leading units were formed into AA Assault Groups, and Lt-Col Hoare with RHQ of 114th LAA Rgt took charge of 'O' AA Assault Group landing on Mike Sector of Juno Beach under the command of 3rd Canadian Division. The Crusader-mounted guns would each tow a conventional Bofors gun ashore. The assault group also included elements of 93rd LAA Rgt equipped with the new 20 mm Polsten gun in triple mountings on Crusader tank chassis towing equipment trailers, and part of 86th (Honourable Artillery Company) Heavy AA Rgt equipped with towed 3.7-inch guns:

O AA Assault Group

- 114th LAA Rgt RHQ (Lt-Col N.W. Hoare)
  - A & B Troops 372/114 LAA Bty
  - D Troop 321/93 LAA Bty
  - 274/86 HAA Bty
  - 1 Troop 383/86 HAA Bty
  - 474th (Independent) Searchlight Battery less B and C Troops
  - 112 Company Pioneer Corps (smoke generators) less detachments
  - 114 LAA Rgt Workshop

375/114 LAA Bty was assigned to the neighbouring 'P' AA Assault Group under RHQ of 86th HAA Rgt landing at Nan Sector. Between them, the two batteries of 114th LAA Rgt deployed 30 Bofors guns (of which 12 were SP tracked) on Juno beach. Meanwhile, 373/114 Bty and C Trp 372/114 Bty (24 SP Bofors) were assigned to 76th AA Bde landing at Gold Beach

The AA units at Juno experienced serious problems on 6 June, with heavy losses in landing craft on the run in, and landing while hard fire-fights were continuing to establish a firm beachhead. Batteries were badly split up, some detachments being separated from their guns. The reconnaissance party of 114th LAA's H Trp landed in Nan Red Sector about 09.00 when the beach was still under heavy mortar fire and cross machine gun fire. A G Troop gun tractor received a direct hit from a mortar and was burnt out. The party gathered under the cliff and decided that it was impossible to land the guns. Lance-Bombardier "Jock" Alexander Wentworth volunteered to report the situation to the battery commander on Nan White beach. This entailed a journey of 1(1/2) miles along the enemy-held shore, which was mined and under fire, and he had to wade part of the way. Having reported to 375 LAA Bty HQ, he then returned under fire with orders to bring H troop round to Nan White where the guns were successfully landed. Wentworth was awarded a Military Medal (MM) for this exploit.

There were greater delays at Mike sector; the guns of B Trp landed at 16.15 and went into action on the beach because the dunes and approaches were mined. Their crews helped to rescue men from burning landing craft at the edge of the water. A Troop's guns were in the process of landing at 19.00 when they engaged a Junkers Ju 88 attacking the landing craft – the only daylight attack on Juno during D-Day. RHQ reported 24 Bofors and 12 x 20 mm of 'O' AA Assault Group ashore by 19.00. In the absence of HAA guns and their radar or of searchlights, which had been unable to land, uncontrolled barrages by the LAA guns were all that was possible during the night, but no concentrated attack occurred. Additional Troops of 114th LAA Rgt landed on D+1 as air attacks began to increase, peaking on D+3.

The Medical Officer (MO) of 114th LAA Rgt, Captain John Wormald, Royal Army Medical Corps, was one of the first MOs to land in Mike Sector on D-Day. He treated casualties on the beach for 48 hours continuously, often under fire, and was the first to take help to a gun crew that took a direct hit next to his dressing station. After two days he moved to a Field Dressing Station where he worked 16–20 hours a day for three weeks, treating military and civilian casualties. Wormald was afterwards awarded the French Croix de Guerre with Silver-Gilt Star.

Once ashore the AA Assault Groups reorganised into regimental groups, with regimental commanders acting as AA Defence Commanders (AADCs) in their immediate areas. Lieutenant-Colonel Hoare's command was as follows:

114 LAA Regimental Group

- All units 114th LAA Rgt except 373 Bty and C/372 Trp
- 321/93 LAA Bty
- 112 Pioneer Company less detachments
- Detachment 63/20 LAA Bty manning Bofors and 20 mm guns on 'Gooseberry' blockships sunk off the beach as breakwaters
- B/139 LAA Rgt manning Bofors on five AA Barges lying off the beach

At 02.30 on 9 June (D+4), an enemy aircraft dropped a number of anti-personnel bombs on a Bofors site of G Trp at the junction of Nan White and Green beaches. The first bomb severely wounded the gun's No 2 while the No 4, Gunner Douglas Taylor, was hit in the leg, though the crew continued to engage the aircraft until it had passed. A second bomb had ignited an ammunition dump a few yards away and while the No 2's wound was being attended to, Taylor led two other men to tackle the blaze, ignoring his own wound and the danger from the exploding ammunition. He was later relieved by the gun's No 1 and taken to a beach dressing station, from which he was evacuated to England the same day. Taylor was awarded the MM.

The night of 15/16 June provided 'the best shoot so far' according to the regimental war diary. The searchlights came into their own and four aircraft were shot down in I Corps sector, though it was impossible to say which batteries actually hit them.

== Normandy ==
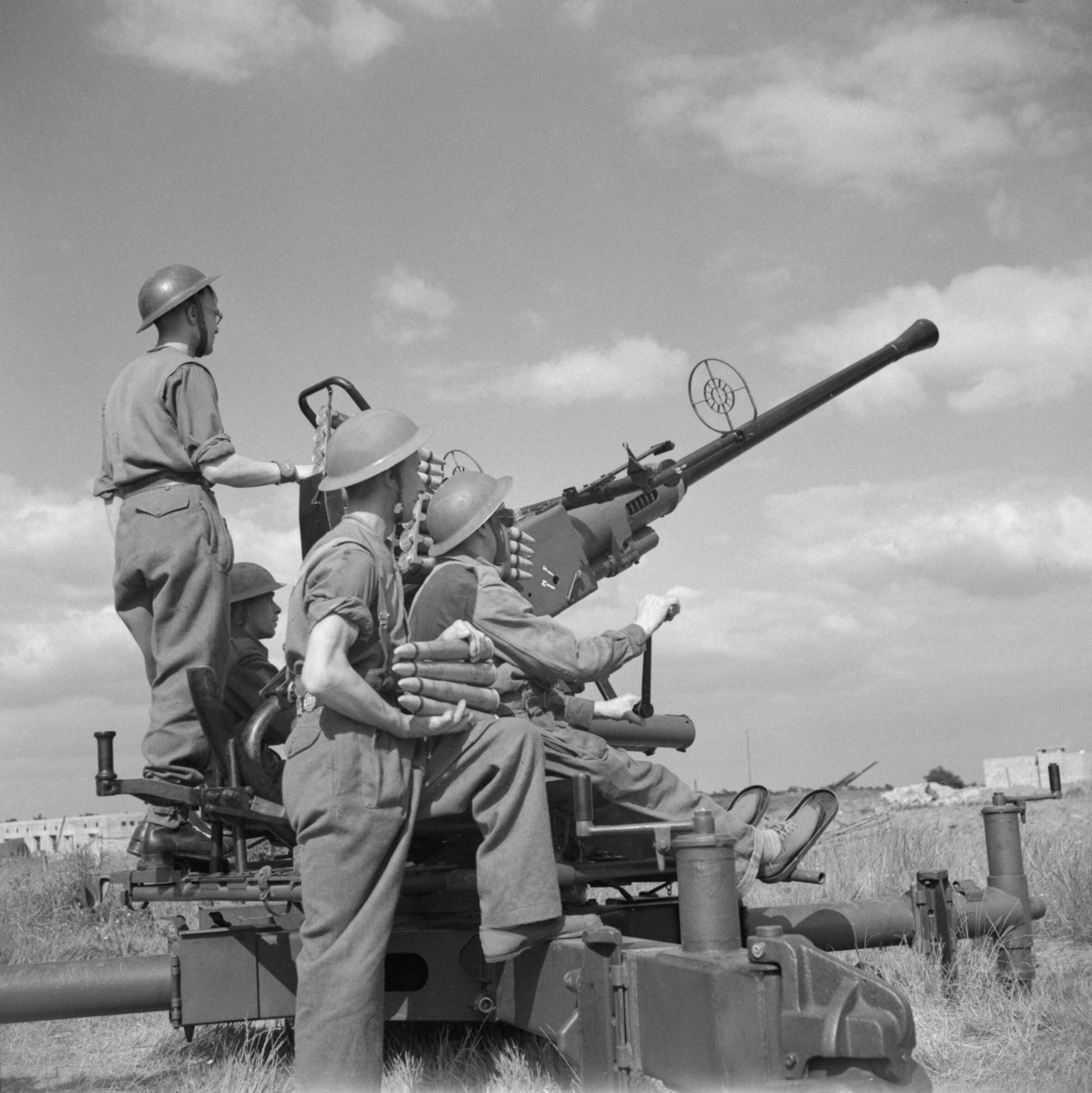
Bofors gun and crew, summer 1944

As the build-up in the Normandy beachhead grew during June and July 1944, 80th AA Bde was tasked with protecting Juno and Sword beaches, the small port of Ouistreham, and the River Orne and Caen Canal bridges. 114th LAA Rgt established RHQ at Courseulles, with part of the regiment astride the Orne and the canal. On 16 June it was ordered to send a Troop to Douvres to catch aircraft attempting to drop supplies to the German troops holding out in the strongpoint there (the Battle of Douvres Radar Station), and on 20 June it was ordered to deploy a roving Troop to protect an important ammunition ship unloading at Ouistreham. When some of the parties of 6/20 LAA Bty were washed off their Gooseberries during the great storm of June, they were distributed to 114th LAA Rgt to ease manning problems.

Although Luftwaffe attacks over the beachhead were generally sporadic, they concentrated on the bridges, while Sword Beach and the whole Eastern Sector remained under mortar and artillery fire. At the end of July, 114th LAA Rgt reported that it was being attacked by a 'secret weapon', which destroyed 372 Bty's HQ, killing a sentry. Upon investigation it appeared that it was being shelled by a large calibre gun from long range. On 13 August 373 Bty finally returned to the regiment from 76th AA Bde.

At the end of August, 21st Army Group broke out from the Normandy beachhead and began to pursue the defeated German troops across Northern France. Reverting to a mobile role, and supported by the 30 three-tonner trucks of 1587 Platoon, Royal Army Service Corps (RASC), 114th LAA Rgt came under the command of the newly arrived 74th AA Bde supporting First Canadian Army. The regiment was amongst the first troops to enter Rouen behind the assaulting Canadian infantry on 30 August. Here it was deployed to protect the crossings of the River Seine. It was withdrawn on 10 September and moved to Dieppe, arriving on 12 September when it reverted to 80 AA Bde command. There were no air raids, but the regiment captured a number of German soldiers, who joined the large numbers in the prisoner-of-war (POW) camp. The regiment was required to act as an infantry cordon in the event of a break-out attempt from the POW camp. Lieutenant-Colonel Hoare was later awarded the French Croix de Guerre with Palm for his work on D-Day and during the Normandy campaign.

== Antwerp ==
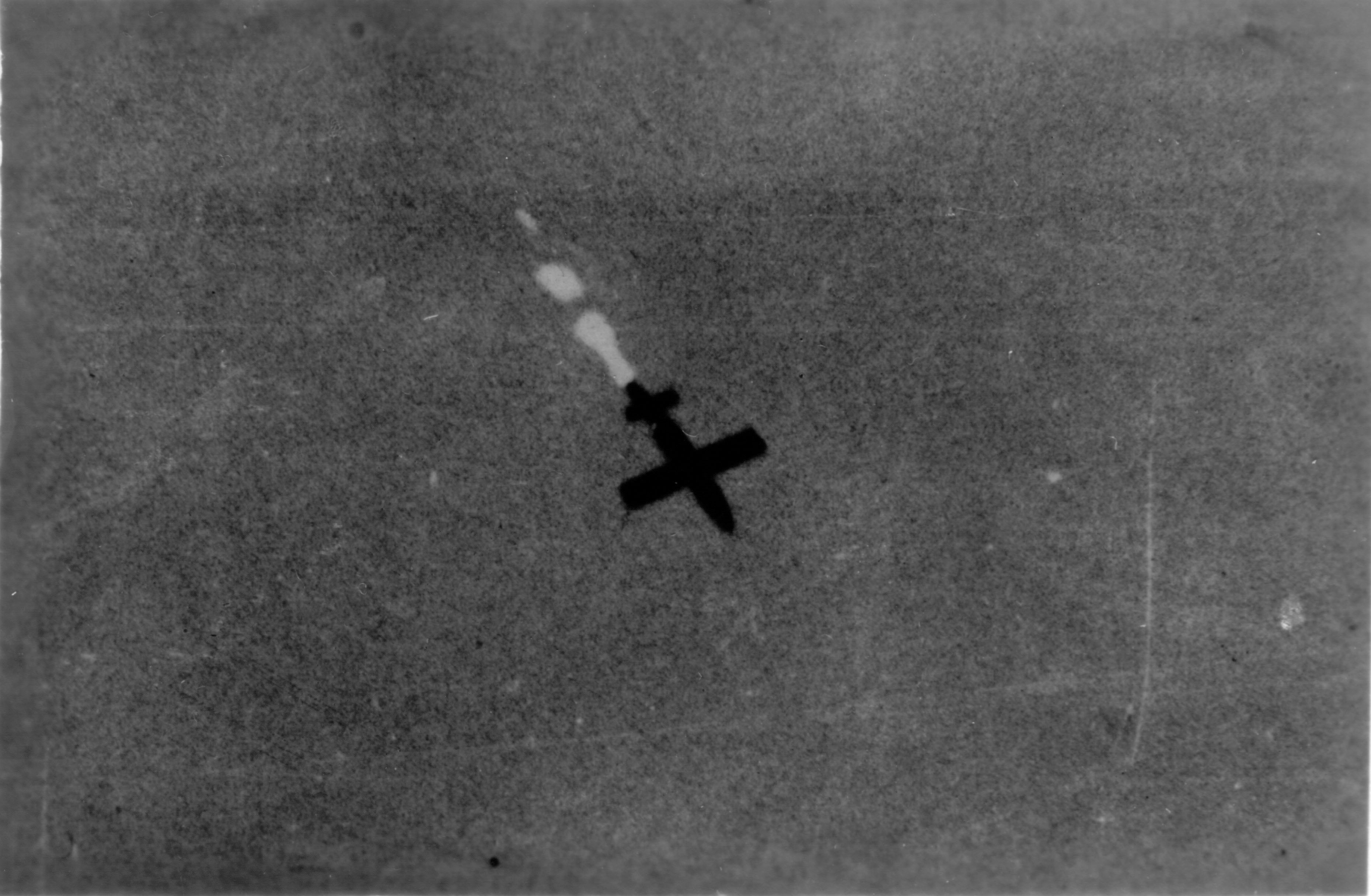
V-1 in flight over Antwerp

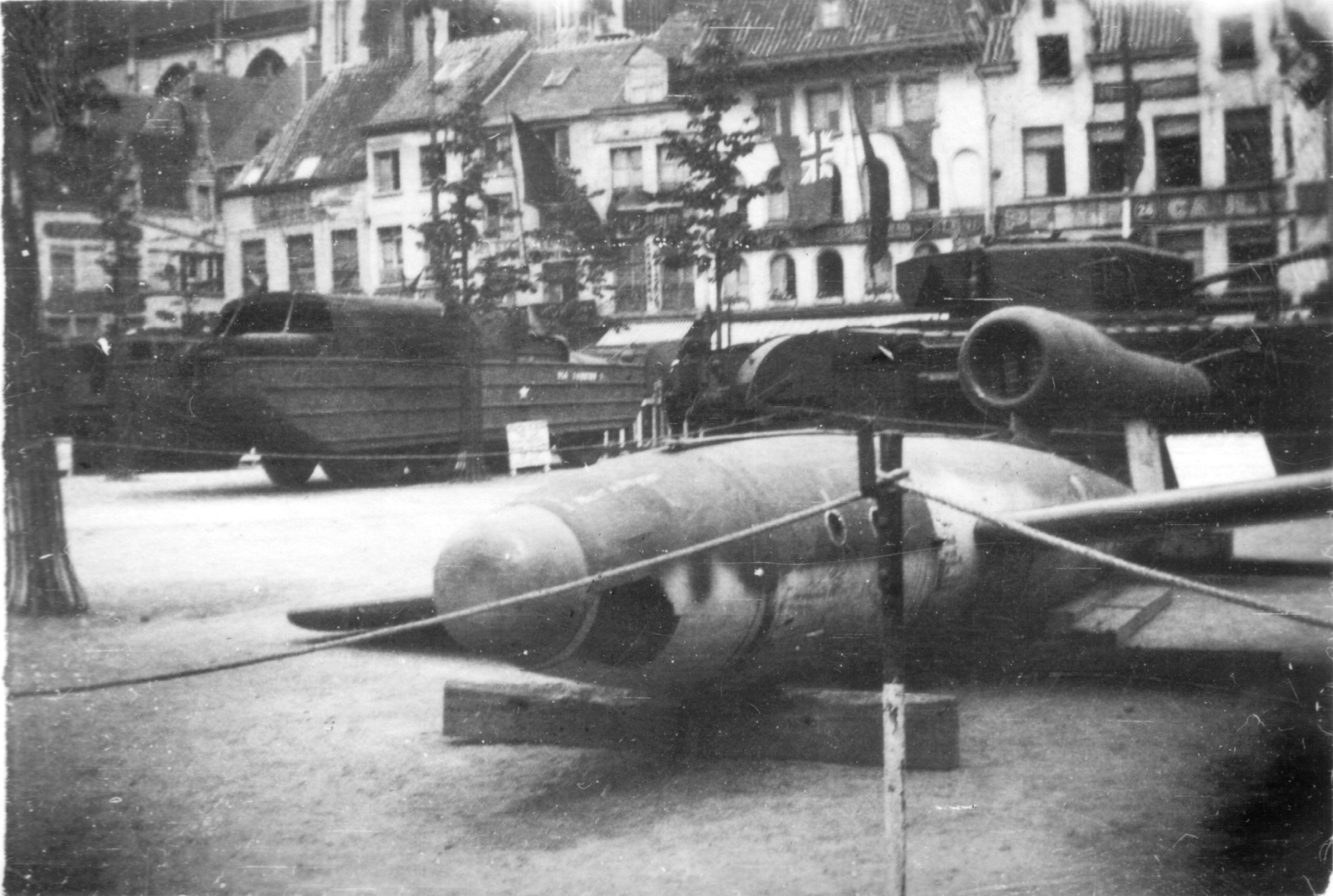
Captured V-1 displayed at Antwerp at the end of World War II.

Clearing the Scheldt Estuary and bringing the port of Antwerp into use as a supply base was an important element in the Overlord plan. The planners envisaged a large AA Gun Defence Area (GDA) to deal not only with conventional air raids but also the threat of V-1 flying bombs (codenamed 'Divers'). 114th LAA Rgt was equipped with the Vickers No 1 AA Predictor (normally used by 3.7-inch HAA batteries) to tackle these small fast-moving targets and on 18 October it arrived at Antwerp to reinforce 5th Royal Marine AA Bde. At first it was deployed along the tops of dykes to guard against German aircraft laying mines in the Scheldt Estuary: the regiment suggested that it would be better to place the guns on Rhine barges (F Troop finally embarked on barges in mid-January). The first 'Diver' arrived in the Antwerp area on 23 October, and the regiment suffered a few casualties, including a fatality when a cinema in the city was hit.

To prevent V-1s falling in the city and dock area, the guns had to be positioned at least 10 miles outside the city, integrated into a system ('Antwerp X') of warning stations and observation posts, supported by radar and searchlights. 114th LAA Regiment provided some of the personnel and equipment for No 2 Local Warning (Radar) Troop formed by 80 AA Bde for this purpose. The Antwerp X deployment, including 114th LAA Rgt, took its full form in December 1944, in time for the peak in V-1 attacks that lasted into February 1945. In mid-January, 114th LAA Rgt redeployed some of its guns for AA rather than anti-minelaying duties. Conventional air attacks were rare, except on 1 January 1945, when the Luftwaffe launched Operation Bodenplatte against Allied airfields on support of the Ardennes offensive, and German aircraft approaching the city were heavily engaged by the AA guns.

== Disbandment ==
As the Allied forces advanced into Germany the air threat dwindled. The last V-1 landed at Antwerp on 29 March, and by late April 1945, a number of AA units were deemed surplus to requirements. 114th LAA Rgt was ordered to cease fire on 17 April, and its REME and RASC detachments were withdrawn. It then reverted to the command of 76th AA Bde and began to hand in its guns and transport. The final order to disband arrived on 8 May (VE Day), and this was completed on 16 June.

== External sources ==
- Royal Artillery 1939–1945
