= 228th (Edinburgh) Heavy Anti-Aircraft Battery, Royal Artillery =

228th (Edinburgh) HAA Battery, RA R (City of Edinburgh) Battery, RA
- Royal Artillery cap badge (pre-1953)
- Active: 1 February 1938 – 1 May 1961
- Country: United Kingdom
- Branch: Territorial Army
- Role: Air defence
- Size: Battery
- Part of: 94th HAA Regiment; 494 (City of Edinburgh) HAA Regiment
- Garrison/HQ: Edinburgh
- Engagements: Battle of Britain; The Blitz; Defence of Gibraltar; Operation Diver

Commanders
- Notable commanders: Brigadier Sir Eric Hutchison, Bt

228th (Edinburgh) Heavy Anti-Aircraft Battery, Royal Artillery was a Scottish air defence unit of Britain's Territorial Army (TA) formed around Edinburgh during the period of international tension leading up to the outbreak of World War II. It defended Eastern Scotland during the early part of the war and then served in the defence of Gibraltar. Its successor unit served in the postwar TA as air defence artillery and as engineers until 1999.

== Origin ==
In January 1938 Scottish newspapers reported measures to increase the anti-aircraft (AA) defences of Scotland's East Coast by the creation of new units of the part-time Territorial Army. These included 228th (Edinburgh) AA Battery, Royal Artillery (RA), which was raised on 1 February 1938 under the command of Major Sir Eric Hutchison, 2nd Baronet of Hardiston, who had served in World War I and was a TA officer in the 62nd (Scottish) Medium Brigade, RA.

On 1 November the battery was brigaded with two other independent AA batteries at Dunfermline on the opposite side of the Firth of Forth to form 71st (Forth) AA Brigade (redesignated an AA Regiment from 1 January 1939). The regiment was part of 36th (Scottish) Anti-Aircraft Brigade, which was responsible for the AA defence of the city of Edinburgh and the Firth of Forth.

On 1 April 1939, 228 Battery was transferred to provide the cadre for another new regiment in 36 AA Bde, 94th AA Regiment, with regimental HQ at Turnhouse near Edinburgh. Hutchison was promoted to Lieutenant-Colonel to command the new regiment. The regiment recruited mainly from banks, insurance and law firms in the city.

== World War II ==
=== Mobilisation and Phoney War ===
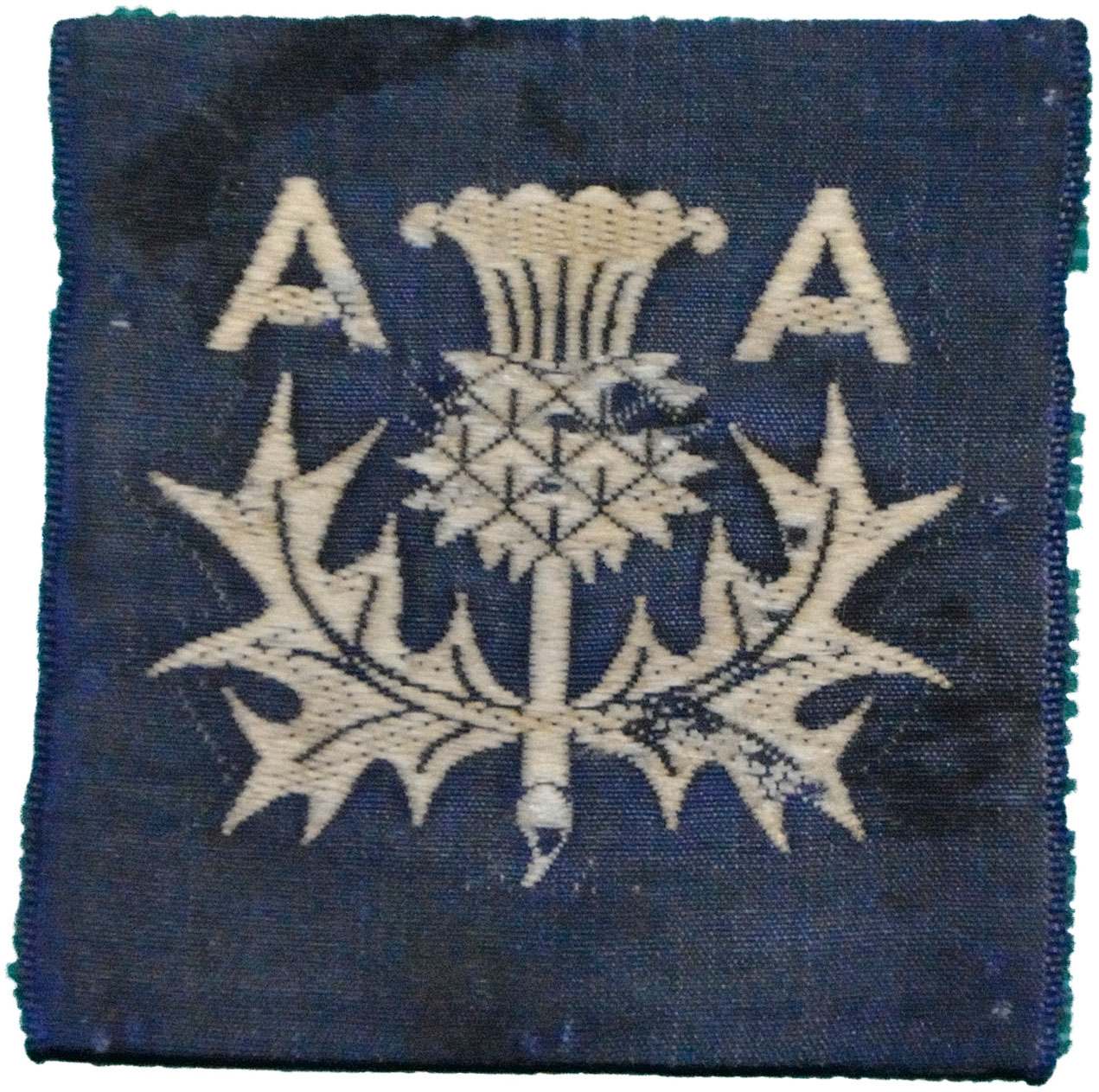
Formation sign of 3rd AA Division.

In June 1939, as the international situation worsened, a partial mobilisation of Anti-Aircraft Command's TA units was begun in a process known as 'couverture', whereby each unit did a month's tour of duty in rotation to man selected AA gun and searchlight positions. On 24 August, ahead of the declaration of war, AA Command was fully mobilised at its war stations. 94th AA Regiment and its three batteries accordingly mobilised under the command of 36th AA Bde in 3rd AA Division.

There was little action for AA Command during the period of the Phoney War, which allowed it to continue building up its strength and equipment, for which 3rd AA Division was given a high priority. 228 (Edinburgh) AA Battery was one of the few units to see any action. It was deployed to defend Aberdeen, and at 13.50 on 7 March 1940 a Heinkel He 111 of the Luftwaffe was spotted by the Royal Air Force (RAF). The gunners calculated the height of the intruder as 18,000 feet (5,500 m), climbing to 24,000 feet (7,300 m), which was beyond the Fuze range of their guns, but they passed the information to the RAF, which 'scrambled' some Spitfires. The fighters flew out over the guns while the gunners continued to track the target, calculating that the gun time-of-flight to the Heinkel was 28 seconds. While the fighters flew out to sea to gain height, the battery fired three salvoes of rounds at fuze settings of 22, 28 and 30 seconds to direct them to the target. Although the Heinkel took avoiding action, the fighters shot it down at a height of 26,000 feet (7,900 m). This was a novel application of the use of 'pointer' rounds developed for AA-fighter cooperation during World War I.

On 1 June 1940, all RA units equipped with the older 3-inch or newer 3.7-inch and 4.5-inch guns were designated as Heavy AA (HAA) regiments to distinguish them from the new Light AA (LAA) regiments appearing in the order of battle.

Although there were some night raids on Scottish cities, the main action in the Battle of Britain and the subsequent Blitz was over Southern England and there were few chances of action for the Scottish AA defences in 1940.

=== Gibraltar ===
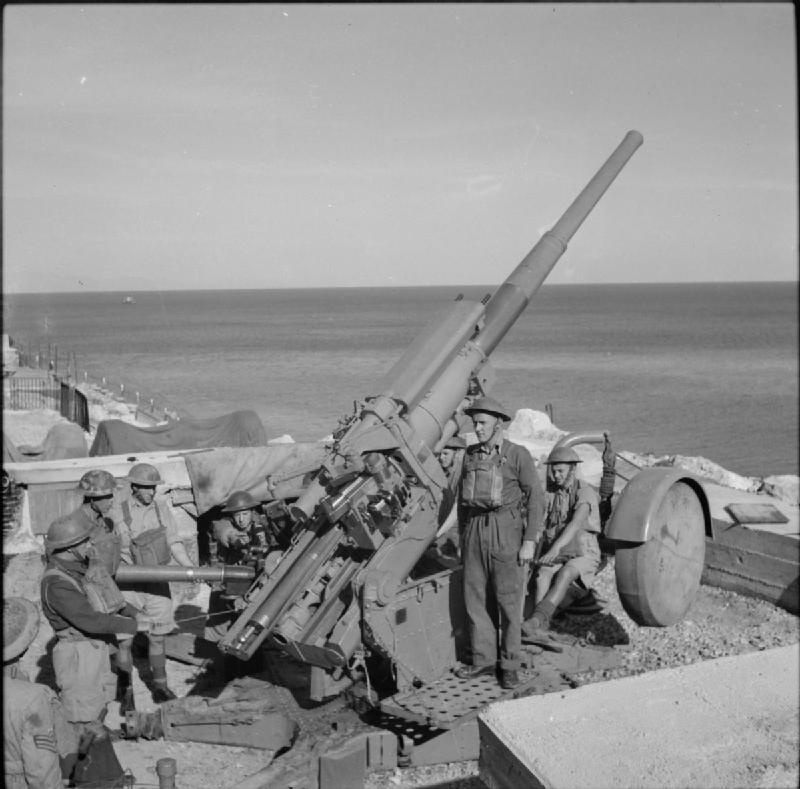
Mobile 3.7-inch HAA gun deployed at White Rock Battery, Gibraltar, November 1941.

In January 1941 94th HAA Rgt left AA Command and became part of the War Office Reserve to mobilise for overseas service. In March 228 (Edinburgh) HAA Bty became independent. In May, 228 HAA Bty embarked for Gibraltar where it joined a newly-formed 13th HAA Rgt and absorbed the personnel of 19 HAA Bty.

On the outbreak of war in September 1939 the AA defences of Gibraltar had been weak, but the Royal Navy Dockyard and airfield became strategically vital in 1940 after the entry of Italy into the war and the Fall of France. Additional AA guns had been installed, manned by the RA, Royal Navy and Gibraltar Defence Force (GDF). Gibraltar suffered a number of air raids during 1940 by the Italian Regia Aeronautica (operating from Sardinia) and from the Vichy French Air Force (from French North Africa) in retaliation for British and Free French attacks on Mers-el-Kebir and Dakar. On other occasions the guns fired at single Italian reconnaissance aircraft, known to the garrison as 'Persistent Percy'.

13th HAA Regiment HQ was formed in Gibraltar to command 228 (Edinburgh) AA Bty, a troop of Z projectors (AA rockets) and the radar battery. The rest of the HAA defences including the GDF batteries came under 82nd (Essex) HAA Rgt. By now there were 28 3.7-inch HAA guns (and four old 3-inch guns manned by the GDF). The gun and searchlight (S/L) sites and Gun-laying radar (GL) positions were carefully selected so that the fire of 20 HAA guns could be brought to bear on a target approaching at a speed of 240 mph from any direction at a typical height of 12,000 feet. Each AA gunsite was also given an Oerlikon 20 mm cannon for self-defence.

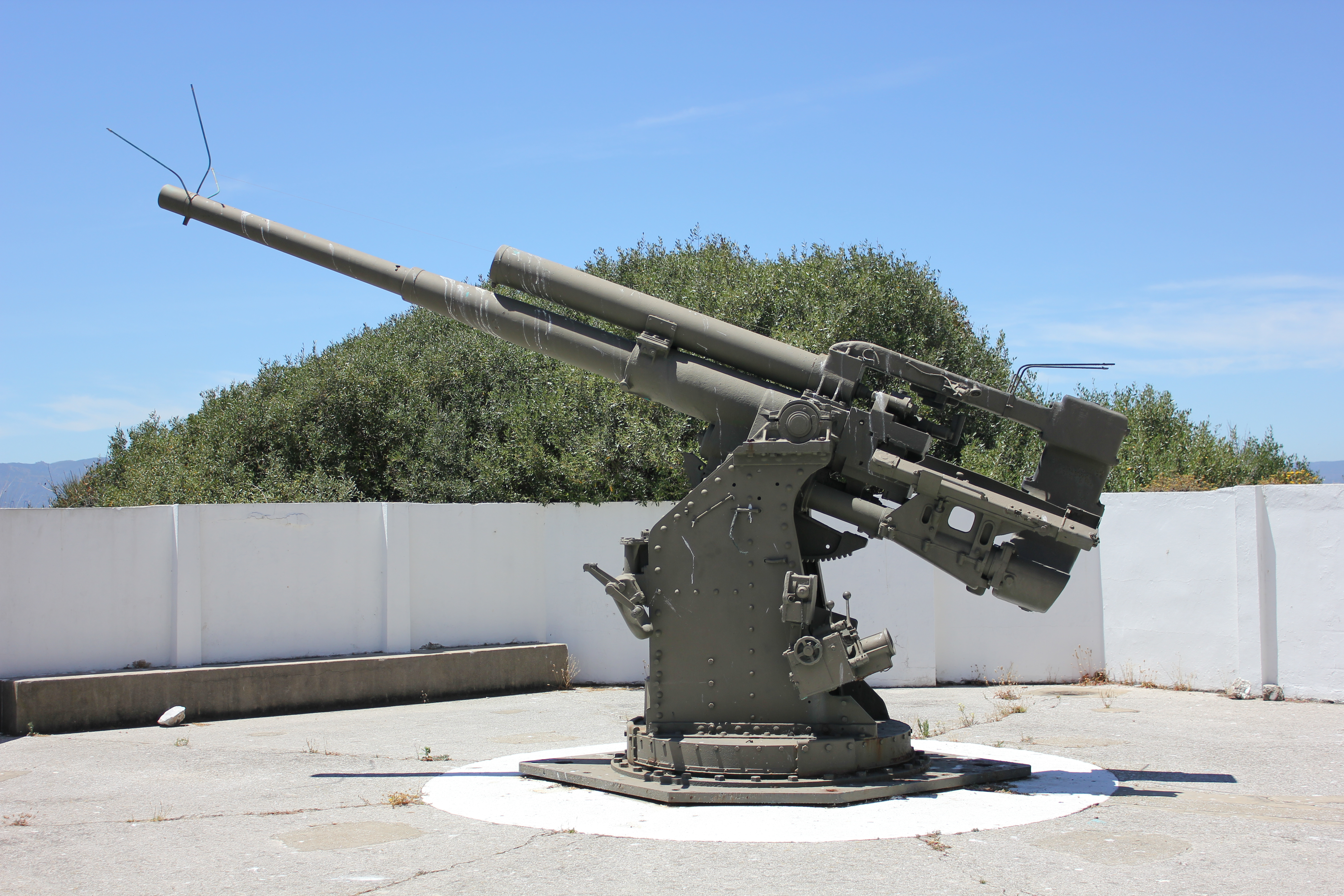
Static 3.7-inch HAA guns preserved at Napier of Magdala Battery, Gibraltar.

During 1941 there were five air raids that were positively identified as Vichy French, another six were attributed to Italian aircraft. A total of nine 'kills' were claimed with one 'probable', though the Vichy and Italian HQs announced higher losses than these, so some aircraft probably crashed in Spain or elsewhere. Throughout 1942, raiding was spasmodic and in small strength, most enemy sorties being confined to high level reconnaissance overflights, including German Luftwaffe Junkers Ju 88 and Heinkel He 111 aircraft from March 1942. There were occasional Italian raids on moonlit mights, generally of three Savoia-Marchetti SM.79 bombers flying at medium height. On 29 June the Royal Air Force early warning radar detected one such raid at a range of 60 miles, which was duly picked up by GL radar as the aircraft turned towards the Rock. One aircraft was illuminated by S/L and shot down, the others were engaged with barrage fire by the HAA guns and Z battery rockets. Although bombs fell on the airfield causing some casualties, two more of the hostile raiders were shot down and crashed in Spain.

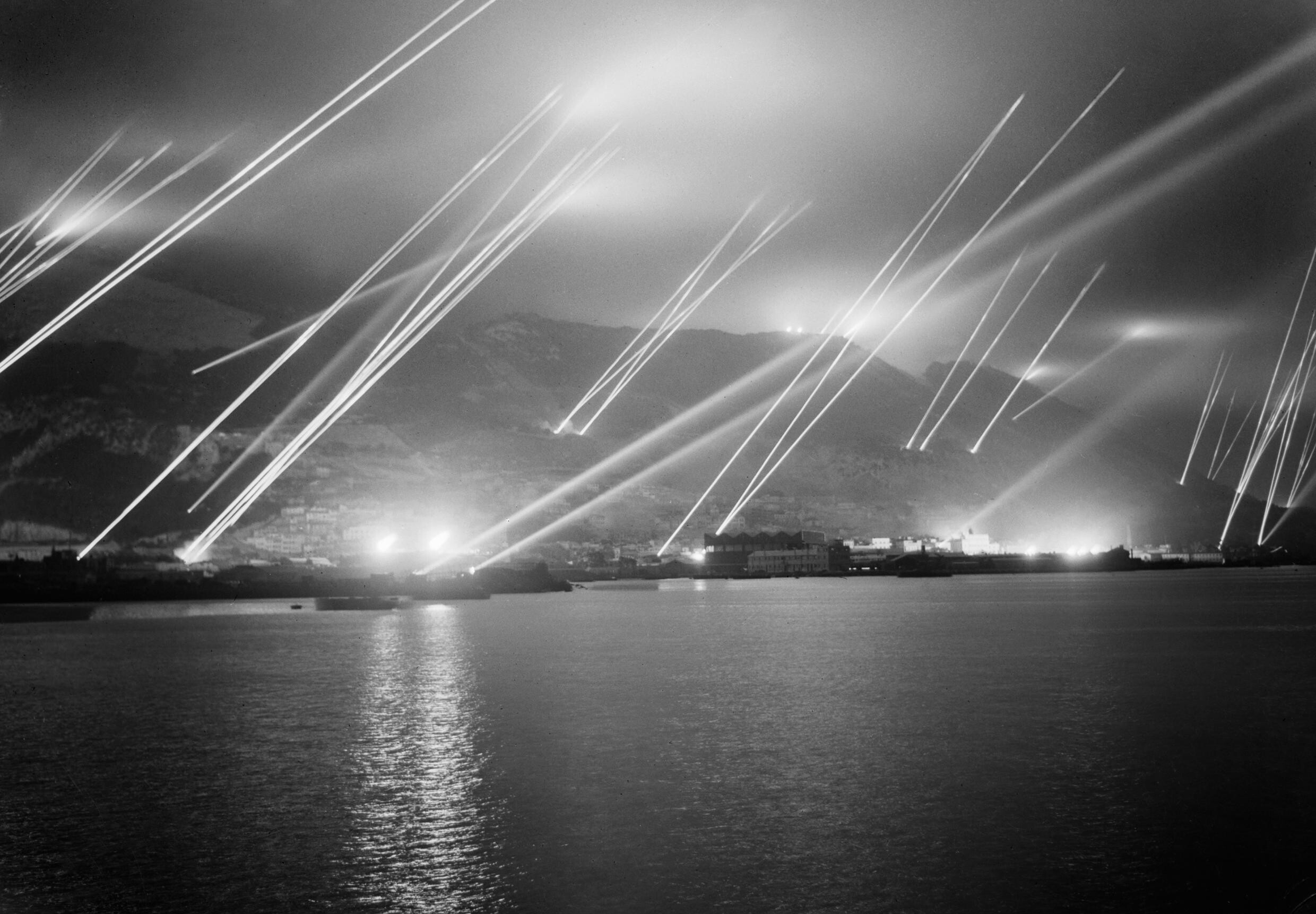
Searchlights over Gibraltar during an air raid practice on 20 November 1942.

During 1942 there were six bombing raids on Gibraltar, two of which were unidentified, and 18 reconnaissance overflights, all but two of them German. Four aircraft were shot down and others crash-landed in Spain. Some of the Italian raids missed their targets and dropped their bombs in Spanish territory, and Spanish AA guns sometimes opened fire as a raid passed towards them. By the end of 1942, the AA defences of Gibraltar reached a peak of scale and efficiency, but the threat had dwindled: there were only two or three more reconnaissance overflights in the whole of 1943. 13th HAA Regiment HQ was disbanded in November 1942 and 228 (Edinburgh) HAA Battery transferred to 82nd (Essex) HAA Rgt. Then when that regiment embarked on 30 May 1941 to return to the UK, the battery passed to the newly-arrived 175th HAA Rgt.

=== Home Defence ===
After more than two years in Gibraltar, 228 (Edinburgh) HAA Bty was relieved in August 1943 and returned to the UK, where it rejoined 82nd (Essex) HAA Rgt in October. At that time the regiment formed part of 35 AA Bde in 2 AA Group covering South East England, but early in 1944 35 AA Bde came under command of 6 AA Group. This was a headquarters that had been moved from Scotland to the South Coast to command the AA defences in the Solent–Portsmouth area covering embarkation ports for the Allied invasion of Normandy (Operation Overlord). In March 1944, 44 AA Bde HQ moved down from Manchester to join 6 AA Group and take over the AA defences on the Isle of Wight covering the Solent, including 82nd HAA Rgt. Shipping at Portsmouth was bombed on four successive nights (25–28 April) during the 'Baby Blitz' of early 1944, and there were sporadic attacks in May, but these failed to disrupt the 'Overlord' preparations. 82nd HAA Regiment moved in early May to join 60 AA Bde in 3 AA Group, covering the invasion ports on the South West Coast.

=== Operation Diver ===
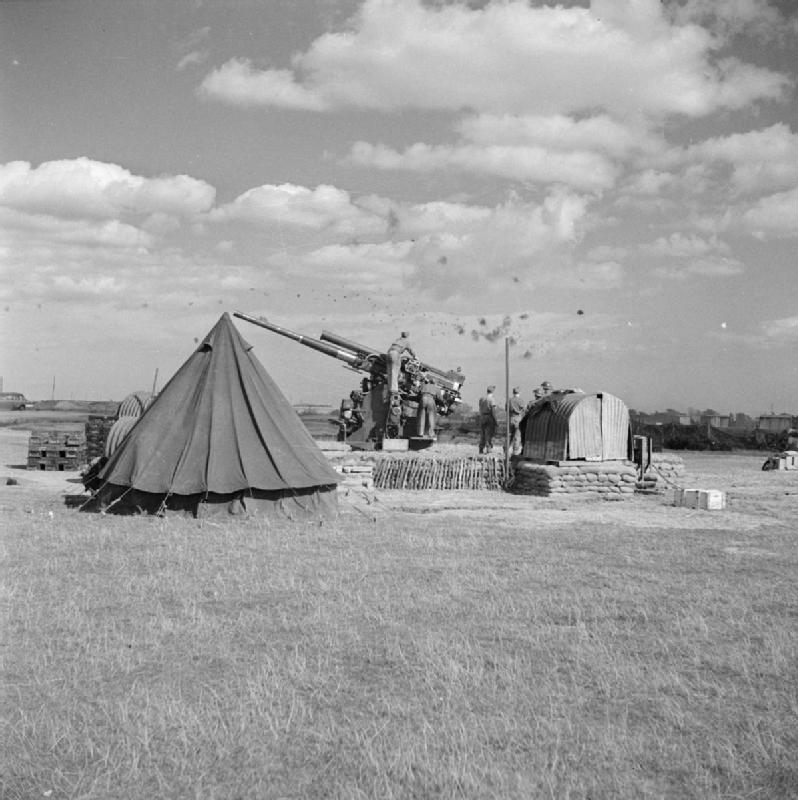
3.7-inch HAA battery in action near London 29 August 1944

The invasion of Normandy was launched on 6 June. A week after D-Day the long-awaited attacks on London by V-1 flying bombs ('Divers') began. AA Command had prepared Operation Diver to counter these weapons, and AA guns were moved from all over the UK to strengthen the 'Diver Belt' in Southern England. In early August 82nd HAA Rgt moved to join 26 (London) AA Bde in 1 AA Group, covering London itself.

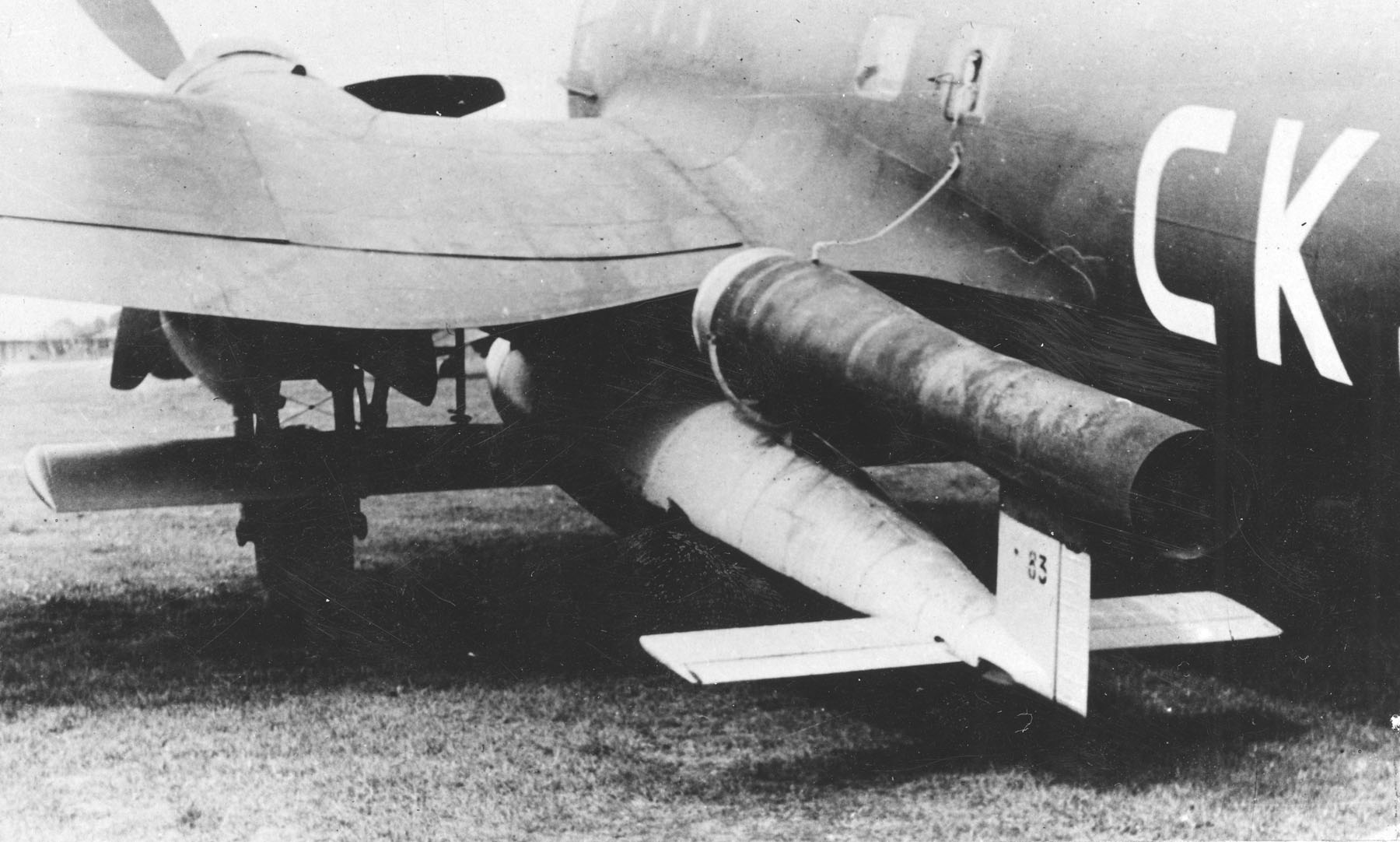
V-1 slung under the wing of a Heinkel He 111 bomber.

As 21st Army Group overran the main launch sites in the Pas-de-Calais, the Luftwaffe shifted its focus to air-launching V-1s over the North Sea during the autumn. Once again AA Command redeployed units in response, this time to Eastern England. New HAA sites had to be quickly established, with static guns mounted on ingenious 'Pile Platforms' (named after the commander of AA Command, Sir Frederick Pile) and thousands of huts moved and re-erected to shelter the crews as winter approached. AA Command formed a new 9 AA Group to take over the 'Diver' defences in East Anglia and in early December 1944 82nd HAA Rgt joined 37 AA Bde in this group.

== Postwar ==
AA Command was rapidly wound down after VE Day. On 25 August 1945 228 (Edinburgh) HAA Bty transferred within the brigade to 143rd HAA Rgt.

=== 37 HAA Battery ===
By 1 January 1947 all the remaining TA personnel had been demobilised and 143rd HAA Rgt and 228 HAA Bty were considered as new war-formed units of the Regular Army. On 1 April that year 143rd HAA Rgt was redesignated 75 HAA Regiment (Note: There was no connection between this regiment and the wartime 75th (Home Counties) (Cinque Ports) HAA Rgt, which had reformed in the postwar TA as 259 (Home Counties) (Cinque Ports) HAA Rgt.) and 228 HAA Bty was formally disbanded at Laindon, Essex, to resuscitate 13 Coast Battery of the Regular RA as 37 HAA Bty in the new regiment.

=== R (City of Edinburgh) Battery ===
Meanwhile, 94th (Edinburgh) HAA Rgt had been reformed in the postwar TA on 1 January 1947 as 494 (Mixed) (City of Edinburgh) HAA Regiment ('Mixed' indicating that members of the Women's Royal Army Corps were integrated into the unit). On 1 January 1954, 494 HAA Rgt was merged into 471 (Mixed) (Forth) HAA Rgt (descended from 71st (Forth) AA Rgt that 228 (Edinburgh) Bty had joined in 1938), in which it formed R (City of Edinburgh) Battery.

However, this arrangement was shortlived; AA Command was disbanded on 10 March 1955 and there were wholescale mergers among its units. 471 (Forth) HAA Regiment amalgamated with 531 LAA/SL Rgt to form 433 LAA Rgt on the North bank of the Forth, but R Bty left to join three Edinburgh LAA regiments, 514 (West Lothian, Royal Scots), 519 (Dunedin) and 587 (Queen's Edinburgh Royal Scots) to form a new 432 LAA Rgt, in which it continued as R (City of Edinburgh) Bty.

In a further reorganisation of the TA on 1 May 1961, 432 LAA Rgt (except the West Lothian elements) was transferred to the Royal Engineers, forming Regimental HQ and 586 Field Squadron of 432 (City of Edinburgh) Corps Engineer Regiment. In the reduction of the TA in 1967, 432 Regiment became 104 (City of Edinburgh) Field Sqn in 71 (Scottish) Engineer Regiment. The squadron was disbanded on 1 July 1999.

== External sources ==
- British Army units from 1945 on
- Orders of Battle at Patriot Files
- Royal Artillery 1939–1945 (archive site)
