= 84th (Middlesex, London Transport) Heavy Anti-Aircraft Regiment, Royal Artillery =

84th (Middlesex, London Transport) Heavy Anti-Aircraft Regiment, RA 484 Heavy Anti-Aircraft Regiment, RA (Middlesex)
- Royal Artillery cap badge
- Active: 1 October 1938–10 March 1955
- Country: United Kingdom
- Branch: Territorial Army
- Role: Air Defence
- Size: Regiment
- Garrison/HQ: Willesden
- Engagements: Norwegian Campaign; The Blitz; Tunisian Campaign; Italian Campaign

The 84th (Middlesex, London Transport) Heavy Anti-Aircraft Regiment, Royal Artillery was an air defence unit of Britain's Territorial Army raised from employees of the London Passenger Transport Board during the period of international tension that preceded the outbreak of World War II. During the war it served in the Norwegian Campaign and the London Blitz, and later in Tunisia and Italy.

== Origin ==
Following the Munich Crisis of 1938, the British War Office rapidly increased the size of Britain's anti-aircraft (AA) defences manned by part-time members of the Territorial Army (TA). The 84th Anti-Aircraft Brigade of the Royal Artillery was raised on 1 October 1938 entirely from employees of the London Passenger Transport Board, a major employer in London and Middlesex. At first the headquarters was at Tottenham, later at Arnos Grove. Equipped with 3-inch guns, the regiment had the following organisation:

- HQ at Arnos Grove
- 260th (London Transport) AA Battery at Arnos Grove
- 261st (London Transport) AA Battery at Arnos Grove (raised 1 November 1938)
- 262nd AA Battery at Willesden
- 263rd AA Battery at Willesden

All AA brigades of the RA were designated as regiments from 1 January 1939, and the 'Middlesex, London Transport' subtitle was adopted in July 1939.

== World War II ==
The TA's Anti-Aircraft Command was mobilised in late August 1939, just before the outbreak of war, when 84th AA Rgt was assigned to 49th Anti-Aircraft Brigade, which was in the process of formation in 1st Anti-Aircraft Division.

=== Norway ===
In April 1940, 260th Bty was detached and deployed to Åndalsnes in Norway as part of Sickleforce, whose commander, Maj-Gen Bernard Paget, had urgently requested additional AA defences against daily air attacks. It was the first heavy AA battery despatched to Norway. However, it lost six of its 3-inch guns and all its transport at sea en route. The remaining two 3-inch guns were damaged during unloading and did not see action. The gunners were evacuated to Scapa Flow on 30 April and later rejoined the regiment.

=== Home defence ===
In the summer of 1940, along with other AA units equipped with the older 3-inch and newer 3.7-inch guns, the 84th was designated a Heavy AA Regiment. During the London Blitz the regiment continued to operate as part of 49 AA Bde at the heart of London's defences. The regiment sent a cadre to 209th Training Regiment at Blandford Camp to provide the basis for a new 388 HAA Bty; this was formed on 14 November 1940 and later joined 121st HAA Rgt. On 14 February 1941 261 HAA Battery left the regiment and later served in North African Campaign with 69th and 94th HAA Rgts in Eighth Army.

In the summer of 1941, 84 HAA Rgt shifted within 1st AA Division to 26th (London) AA Bde. By October 1941, the regiment was part of the War Office Reserve, though still in AA Command, and continued to be so for the next year.

In January 1942, it moved to 37 AA Bde in 6th AA Division on the North side of the Thames Estuary.

In August 1942 it moved again to 56 AA Bde in Kent. By the autumn it was being prepared for overseas service as a mobile unit and was joined by its own 84 HAA Rgt Platoon (later 1524 HAA Rgt Platoon) of the Royal Army Service Corps.

In the New Year, 84 HAA Rgt finally left AA Command, and in mid-February was waiting to proceed overseas to join First Army in Tunisia as a mobile regiment with the following composition:

- 260 HAA Bty
- 262 HAA Bty
- 263 HAA Bty
- 84 HAA Rgt Signal Section, Royal Corps of Signals
- 1524 HAA Rgt Platoon, RASC
- 84 HAA Rgt Workshop Section, Royal Electrical and Mechanical Engineers

=== North Africa ===
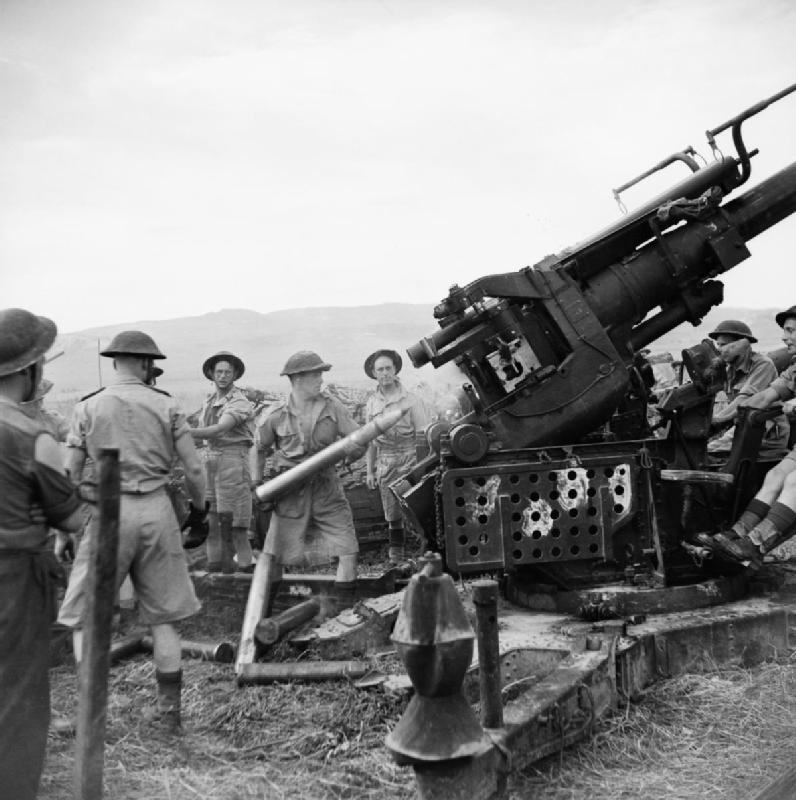
A 3.7-inch AA gun in Tunisia, 1943, operating in a field gun role.

The regiment left the UK and joined Allied Force Headquarters in North Africa. By mid-March 1943 it was deployed around Bone in Algeria and Tabarka in Tunisia under 66th AA Brigade. Bone was under regular air attack and 66th AA Bde had little early warning of attacks, as a result it 'was being hammered'. By the culmination of the campaign, in May, 84th HAA Rgt had been transferred to 52nd AA Brigade and was 'on its wheels ready to move to Tunis and Bizerta, immediately behind the leading battle groups' of Operation Vulcan. When the Axis forces surrendered, it was in the process of deploying in Bizerta, which was designated an 'Inner Artillery Zone' for air defence.

=== Italy ===
84th HAA Regiment later served with Eighth Army in the Italian Campaign. When the Eighth Army closed up to the German Winter Line in December 1943, 84th HAA reinforced 2nd AA Brigade, which was stretched from the River Sangro back to the Foggia Airfield Complex, protecting field gun positions, landing-grounds, railheads and airfields. By early 1944, raids by the German Luftwaffe were becoming less frequent, but the brigade commander, Brig H.M.J. McIntyre, was an enthusiast for employing the versatile 3.7-inch HAA gun against ground targets. For 'Operation Kishan', carried out by 10th Infantry Brigade in May 1944, 84th and 88th HAA Rgts deployed 44 guns and fired 9881 rounds in bombardment and harassing fire in one week. On one occasion, three Troops of 84th HAA broke up a concentration of 300 German troops forming up for an attack. Forward deployment could be dangerous: on 29 August a Troop of 84th HAA south of the River Arno was heavily shelled for an hour and suffered casualties and loss of equipment, but no guns were put out of action.

In late 1944 the Luftwaffe was suffering from such shortages of pilots, aircraft and fuel that serious aerial attacks were rare. At the same time the British Army was suffering a severe manpower shortage. The result was that a number of AA units were deemed surplus and were disbanded to provide reinforcements to other arms of service. 84th HAA Regiment was the unit selected from 2 AA Bde, and it was broken up in October and formally placed in 'suspended animation' on 7 November 1944.

== Postwar ==
When the TA was reconstituted in 1947, the regiment was reformed as 484 (Mixed) Heavy Anti-Aircraft Regiment, RA (Middlesex) (the 'Mixed' referring to the fact that members of the Women's Royal Army Corps were integrated into the unit). The HQ of the reformed regiment was now at Willesden, and in 1951 it was adopted by the Municipal Borough of Willesden. The regiment formed part of 63 AA Brigade based in North West London. However, 484 HAA Regiment was disbanded in 1955 when AA Command was abolished.
