= 71st (Forth) Heavy Anti-Aircraft Regiment, Royal Artillery =

71st (Forth) Heavy Anti-Aircraft Regiment, RA
- Cap Badge of the Royal Artillery (pre-1953)
- Active: 1 November 1938–1 May 1961
- Country: United Kingdom
- Branch: Territorial Army
- Type: Heavy Anti-Aircraft Regiment
- Role: Air Defence
- Part of: 3rd AA Division; Allied Forces Headquarters; Eighth Army; French XIX Corps; US IV Corps; 3 AA Group
- Garrison/HQ: Dunfermline
- Engagements: The Blitz; North African Campaign; Italian Campaign

Commanders
- Honorary Colonel: 10th Earl of Elgin and Kincardine

The 71st (Forth) Heavy Anti-Aircraft Regiment, Royal Artillery was an air defence unit of Britain's Territorial Army (TA) formed in Scotland just before World War II. It served in North Africa and Italy during the war. Its successors continue to serve in the Army Reserve as part of the Royal Logistic Corps.

== Origin ==
The regiment was raised in the Royal Artillery (RA) 1 November 1938 as part of the expansion in Britain's anti-aircraft (AA) defences in the period of tension before World War II. The new unit was formed from three existing AA batteries:

71st (Forth) AA Regiment

- Regimental Headquarters (RHQ) at Dunfermline
- 227 (Fife) AA Battery, Dunfermline – converted from 224th (Fife) Medium Battery of 56th (Highland) Medium Regiment, RA, descended from the Highland (Fifeshire) Heavy Battery of World War I
- 228 (Edinburgh) AA Battery – formed 1 February 1938
- 229 (Forth) AA Battery, Dunfermline – formed 1 February 1938

The Commanding Officer, Lt-Col A.R. Black, and senior Major, Sir Eric Hutchison, 2nd Baronet of Hardiston, were veterans of World War I. The Honorary Colonel was the 10th Earl of Elgin and Kincardine (who, as Major Lord Bruce, had been commander of the Highland Heavy Battery in World War I). Adam Dundas of Dundas, 29th Chief of Clan Dundas, was commissioned as a 2nd Lieutenant in the regiment in 1938 and rose to command a battery in World War II, ending as Major.

The regiment became part of 36th (Scottish) Anti-Aircraft Brigade, based at Edinburgh, when that was formed on 1 May 1938 to take responsibility for the AA defence of the city of Edinburgh and the Firth of Forth. That formation in turn was subordinated to the new 3rd Anti-Aircraft Division formed at Edinburgh on 1 September 1938. 3rd AA Division commanded all the AA units within Scottish Command, transferring to Anti-Aircraft Command when that formation was created on 1 April 1939.

On 1 April 1939, 228 Battery was transferred to provide the cadre for another new regiment in 36 AA Bde, 94th AA Regiment.

== World War II ==
=== Mobilisation ===
The TA's AA units were mobilised on 23 September 1938 during the Munich Crisis, with units manning their emergency positions within 24 hours, even though many did not yet have their full complement of men or equipment. The emergency lasted three weeks, and they were stood down on 13 October. In February 1939, the existing AA defences came under the control of a new Anti-Aircraft Command. In June, a partial mobilisation of TA units was begun in a process known as 'couverture', whereby each AA unit did a month's tour of duty in rotation to man selected AA and searchlight positions. On 24 August, as the crisis in Europe developed, AA Command was fully mobilised at its war stations.

=== Home Defence ===
Unlike most of Britain's defence forces, 3 AA Division was frequently in action during the so-called Phoney War that lasted from September 1939 to May 1940. The first action occurred unexpectedly on 16 October 1939, when nine enemy aircraft suddenly appeared out of cloud and dived on warships off Rosyth Dockyard, close to the Forth Bridge. No warning had been given, but the crews of 71 HAA Rgt were undergoing gun drill and the gun positions hastily loaded for a 'crash' action under individual gun control, normal prediction being impossible against diving and turning targets. A total of 104 rounds were fired and one aircraft had its tail shot off (fighters accounted for another two). HMS Southampton was damaged. These are thought to have been the first British guns to open fire against the enemy during the war.

AA Command expanded and reorganised as the war progressed. The AA regiments of the RA were designated 'Heavy AA' (HAA) from 1 June 1940 to distinguish them from the newer Light AA (LAA) units. 71 HAA Regt continued to defend the Edinburgh and Firth of Forth area during The Blitz. The regiment formed a new 325 AA Bty on 12 July 1940. The regiment later sent a cadre to 205th HAA Training Regiment at Aborfield to provide the basis for a new 382 HAA Bty; this was formed on 14 November 1940 and joined the regiment on 8 February 1941.

On 18 June 1941, 382 Bty went to the Orkney and Shetland Defences (OSDEF) where it was attached to 108th HAA Rgt and was replaced by 317 Bty from 101st HAA Regiment in OSDEF. The regiment sent another cadre to 211th HAA Training Regiment at Oswestry for a new 455 (Mixed) HAA Bty; this was formed on 10 July 1941 and joined 129th HAA Rgt.

By October 1941, 71st HAA Rgt was part of the War Office Reserve and available for service in the field, though still in AA Command. At this time, the regiment moved south to join 34th (South Midland) AA Bde in 11th AA Division, defending Birmingham and Coventry. Then in January 1942 it moved again, to 29th (East Anglian) AA Bde in 6th AA Division in Kent.

On 19 February 1942, 317 Bty left the regiment and returned to 3rd AA Division in Scotland to join 147th HAA Rgt, while 71st HAA Rgt became an unbrigaded regiment before leaving AA Command completely in May.

The regiment was now a mobile unit under direct War Office control and was joined by its own Royal Electrical and Mechanical Engineers (REME) workshop. By November, it was fully equipped for a mobile role, with the following composition:

- 227 HAA Bty
- 228 HAA Bty
- 325 HAA Bty
- 71 HAA Rgt Signal Section, Royal Corps of Signals
- 71 HAA Workshop, REME
- 71 HAA Rgt Ptn Royal Army Service Corps (RASC)

=== North African campaign ===
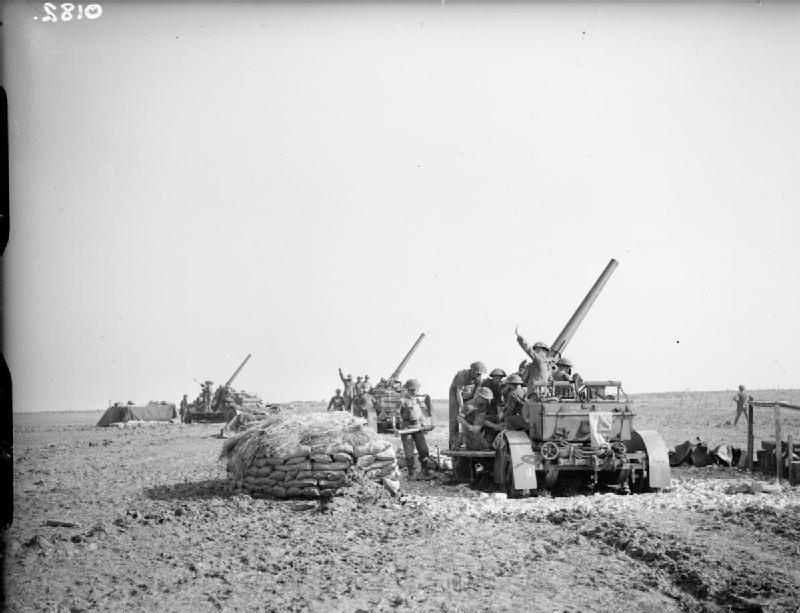
3-inch AA guns on cruciform travelling carriages.

In November 1942, equipped with mobile 3-inch guns, the regiment sailed for North Africa, landing in December after Operation Torch to join 52 AA Brigade (formerly defending Edinburgh) under Allied Force Headquarters in Algeria. By January 1943, it was located in the Philippeville area. In mid-January, two Btys of 71st HAA were stationed at Djidjelli airfield (1 Bty), Philippeville port and airfield (1 Trp), and Ain Beida airfield (1 Trp), with the third battery still en route. By mid-March, one Bty was at Youks-les-Bains Airfield, a full Bty at Ain Beida, and the third battery was guarding French XIX Corps HQ. In the final phase of the campaign, the regiment was deployed guarding Tunisian airfields under 22 AA Bde.

=== Italian campaign ===
71 HAA Regiment followed AFHQ to Italy in September 1943 and served under Eighth Army. It joined 66 AA Bde covering the Salerno area in January 1944, and the brigade took over defence of the Anzio area as well in July 1944. In June 1944, the regiment joined 62 AA Bde supporting US IV Corps in its advance to the Arno and beyond. All the British HAA regiments working with US forces retained their AA role, but one battery was also assigned a corps ground role as medium artillery, providing fire tasks for US and British troops. With ample stocks of AA ammunition, and few German aircraft remaining in the theatre, the modern 3.7-inch guns then in use were in great demand for tasks such as Counter-battery fire, 62 AA Bde forming a flash-spotting troop from HAA command post staff. When the Germans launched a counter-attack to retake Leghorn, 71 HAA responded to 104 calls for support, firing 1840 rounds. The regiment left Italy in January 1945 and returned to the UK where it rejoined Home Forces in February, preparatory to disbandment.

71st (Forth) HAA Regiment with its three batteries was placed in suspended animation at some point between 14 October 1945 and 21 February 1946.

== Postwar ==
When the TA was reconstituted on 1 January 1947, 71st HAA Regiment was reformed at Dunfermline as 471st (Forth) Heavy Anti-Aircraft Regiment, RA (TA), forming part of 78 AA Bde (the former 52 AA Bde in North Africa) at Perth, in 3 AA Group. (The postwar 71st HAA Regiment was a Regular Army unit formed in Libya from personnel who had been serving with the former 51st (London) HAA Regiment when it was demobilised.) 471 Regiment was designated 'Mixed', indicating that members of the Women's Royal Army Corps were integrated into the unit.

On 1 January 1954, the regiment absorbed 494 (City of Edinburgh) HAA Regiment (the former 94th HAA regiment for which 71st HAA Regiment had provided the cadre). The 494 Regiment personnel formed R (City of Edinburgh) Battery. However, AA Command was disbanded in March 1955 and there was a major reduction in AA units of the TA. R Battery left again to merge with other Edinburgh units, and 471 HAA Regiment absorbed 531 Light AA/Searchlight Regiment from Perthshire to form 433rd Light Anti-Aircraft Regiment, RA (TA):

- RHQ at Dunfermline – ex 471 Rgt
- P (Forth) Battery – one Troop ex 471
- Q (Forth) Battery – ex 471 Rgt
- R (Alloa) Battery – ex 531 Rgt
- S (Perth) Battery – ex 531 Rgt

The following year, the regiment absorbed a battery from 413 (Fife) Coast Regiment, RA, which was being broken up.

A further reduction in the TA in 1961 saw the regiment converted to the transport role as HQ and 512 and 531 Heavy General Transport Companies of 433 (Fife) Transport Column, Royal Army Service Corps based at Dunfermline. This unit was later designated 433 (Forth) Regiment, Royal Corps of Transport and now forms part of the Scottish Transport Regiment of the Royal Logistic Corps.

== Honorary Colonel ==
- Colonel Edward Bruce, 10th Earl of Elgin and Kincardine, KT, CMG, TD, appointed 28 January 1939.
