= 36th (Scottish) Anti-Aircraft Brigade =

36th (Scottish) Anti-Aircraft Brigade 62 Anti-Aircraft Brigade
- Active: 1 May 1938–20 February 1944; 1 April 1947 – 27 September 1948 (as 62 AA Bde)
- Country: United Kingdom
- Branch: Territorial Army
- Type: Anti-Aircraft Brigade
- Role: Air Defence
- Part of: 3rd AA Division; 7th AA Division; 6th AA Group
- Garrison/HQ: Edinburgh; South Queensferry
- Engagements: The Blitz

36th (Scottish) Anti-Aircraft Brigade was an air defence formation of Britain's Territorial Army, created in the period of tension before the outbreak of the Second World War. It was responsible for defending eastern Scotland.

== Origins ==
Large numbers of Territorial Army (TA) units were converted to anti-aircraft (AA) and searchlight roles in the Royal Artillery (RA) and Royal Engineers (RE) during the 1930s, and higher formations were required to control them. 36th (Scottish) Anti-Aircraft Brigade (36 AA Bde) was formed on 1 May 1938 at Edinburgh, to command the units responsible for the air defence of Edinburgh and the Firth of Forth. Its first commander was Brigadier G.C. Kemp (appointed 1 May 1938). Initially the brigade was formed within Scottish Command, later being subordinated to 3rd Anti-Aircraft Division when that formation was raised at Edinburgh on 1 September 1938 to command all the AA defences of Scotland and Northern Ireland. Subsequently, Anti-Aircraft Command was created on 1 April 1939 and took control of AA Defence throughout the United Kingdom.

== Mobilisation ==
The TA's AA units were mobilised on 23 September 1938 during the Munich Crisis, units manning their emergency positions within 24 hours, even though many did not yet have their full complement of men or equipment. The emergency lasted three weeks, and they were stood down on 13 October. In February 1939 the existing AA defences came under the control of a new Anti-Aircraft Command. In June a partial mobilisation of TA units was begun in a process known as 'couverture', whereby each AA unit did a month's tour of duty in rotation to man selected AA and searchlight positions. On 24 August, ahead of the declaration of war, AA Command was fully mobilised at its war stations.

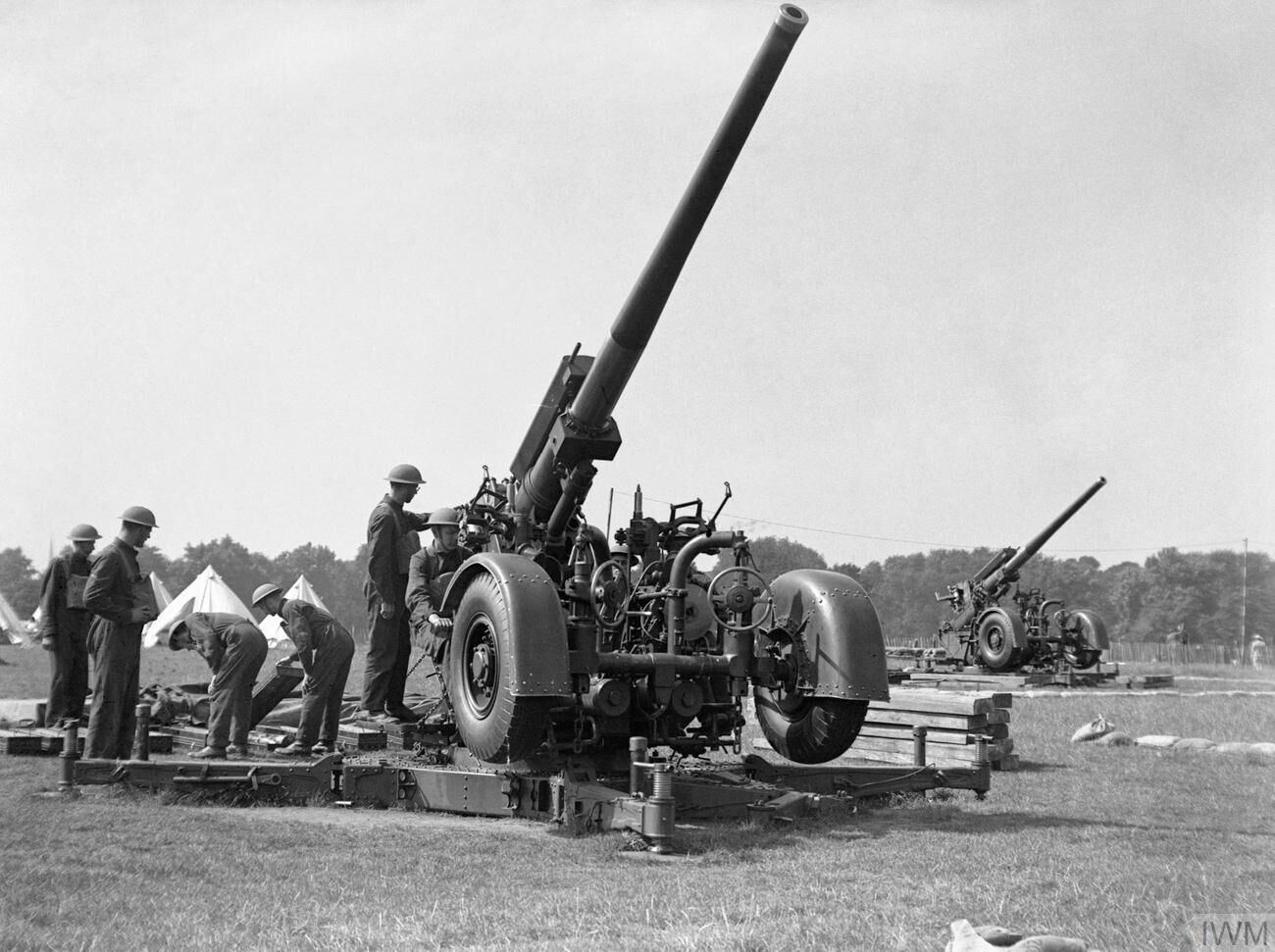
3.7-inch HAA gun deployed in 1939.

=== Order of battle 1939 ===
The composition of 36 AA Bde on the outbreak of war was as follows:

- 71st (Forth) AA Regiment, RA – formed 1938 from independent AA batteries
  - HQ at Dunfermline
  - 227 (Fife) AA Bty at Dunfermline
  - 228 (Edinburgh) AA Bty at Edinburgh – formed cadre for 94th AA Rgt
  - 229 (Fife) AA Bty at Dunfermline
- 94th AA Regiment, RA – formed April 1939
  - HQ at Turnhouse
  - 228 (Edinburgh) AA Bty – from 71st AA Rgt
  - 291 AA Bty at Turnhouse
  - 292 AA Bty at Musselburgh
- 101st AA Regiment, RA – formed August 1939
  - HQ at Inverness
  - 226 (Caithness and Orkney) AA Bty at Kirkwall – previously independent battery
  - 297 (Inverness) AA Bty at Inverness – previously independent battery
- 36 Anti-Aircraft Brigade Company, Royal Army Service Corps

In September 1939, the brigade had 28 heavy AA guns deployed round the Forth, with one more out of action.

== Battle of Britain and the Blitz ==
The AA regiments of the RA were designated 'Heavy AA' (HAA) from the summer of 1940 (at the time of the Battle of Britain) to distinguish them from the newer Light AA (LAA) units being formed.

=== Order of Battle 1940–41 ===
During the night bombing Blitz on industrial cities in the winter of 1940–41, 36 AA Bde had the following composition:

- 71st (Forth) HAA Regiment, RA – as above
- 114th HAA Regiment, RA – formed November 1940
  - 357, 358, 360 HAA Btys
- 31st LAA Regiment, RA – formed August 1939 at Perth; transferred from 51 Light AA Bde
  - HQ at Perth,
  - 61 LAA Bty at Grangemouth
  - 101 LAA Bty at RAF Leuchars and RAF Donibristle providing cover for airfields
- 32nd LAA Regiment, RA – formed August 1939 at Falkirk; transferred from 51 Light AA Bde
  - HQ at Falkirk
  - 55 LAA Bty at Rosyth naval base
  - 98 LAA Bty at Falkirk,
  - 103 LAA Bty at Royal Ordnance Factories at Bishopton and Rosyth – replaced by 233 LAA Bty by May 1941
- 3rd AA 'Z' Rgt – new regiment equipped with Z Battery rocket launchers formed in September 1940
  - 103, 107, 115, 118 Z Btys

== Mid-war ==
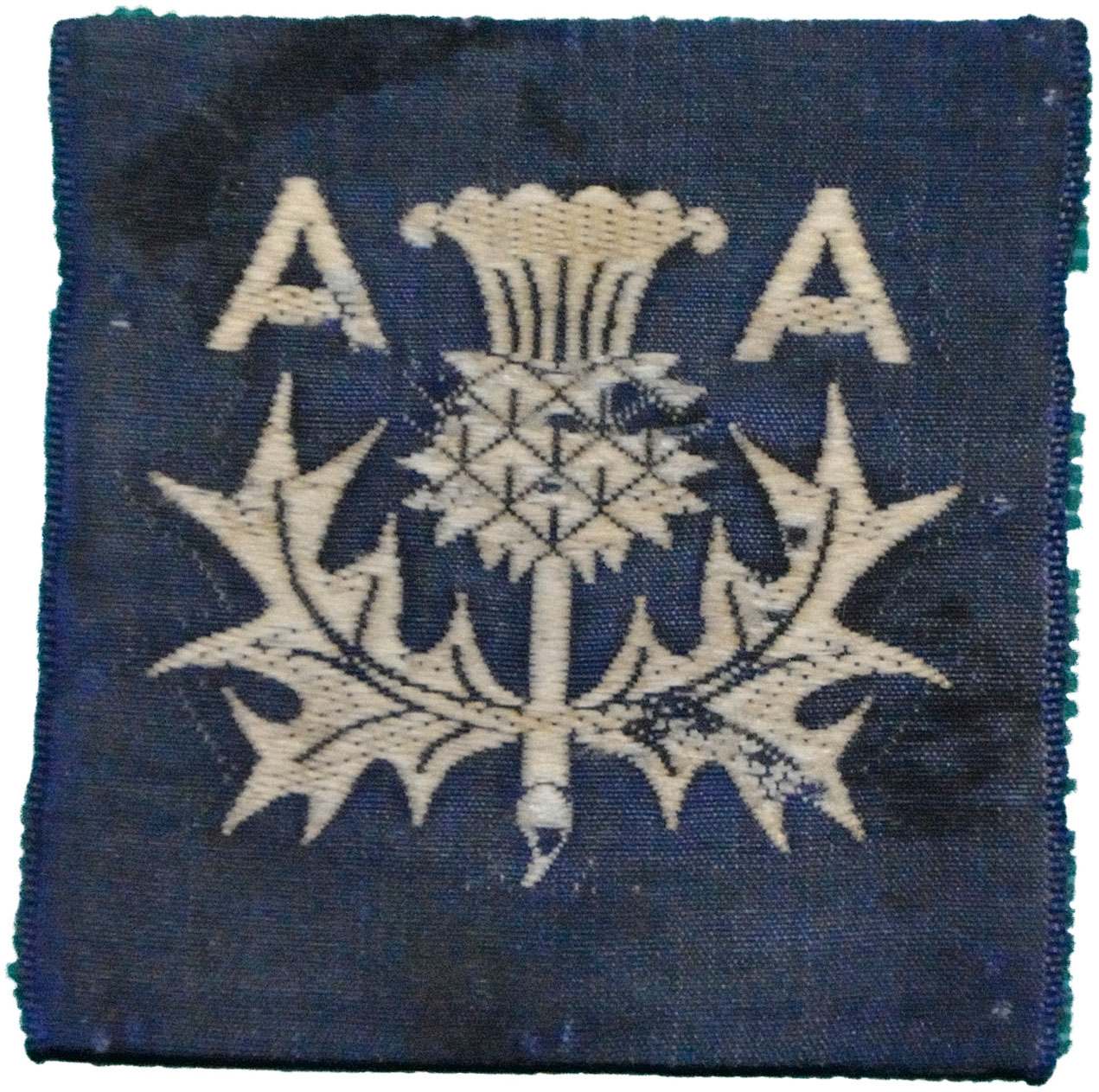
3 AA Divisional sign, worn 1940–42

The Blitz ended in May 1941, but there were occasional raids thereafter and AA Command continued to strengthen its defences. Newly formed units joining AA Command were increasingly 'mixed' ones into which women of the Auxiliary Territorial Service were integrated, while those armed with Z Battery rocket projectiles were partly manned by members of the Home Guard. At the same time, experienced units were posted away for service overseas. This led to a continual turnover of units, which accelerated in 1942 with the preparations for Operation Torch.

=== Order of Battle 1941–42 ===
From the summer of 1941 the brigade's order of battle was as follows:

- 71st (Forth) HAA Rgt
  - 227, 229, 325 HAA Btys
  - 382 HAA Bty – attached to 108 HAA Rgt June 1941; left Summer 1941
  - 317 HAA Bty – from 101st HAA Rgt Summer 1941
- 114th HAA Rgt – to 51 AA Bde May 1942
  - 357, 360 HAA Btys
  - 358 HAA Bty – to new 147th HAA Rgt February, returned March 1942
  - 317 HAA Bty (attached to 51 AA Bde) – from 147th HAA Rgt March 1942

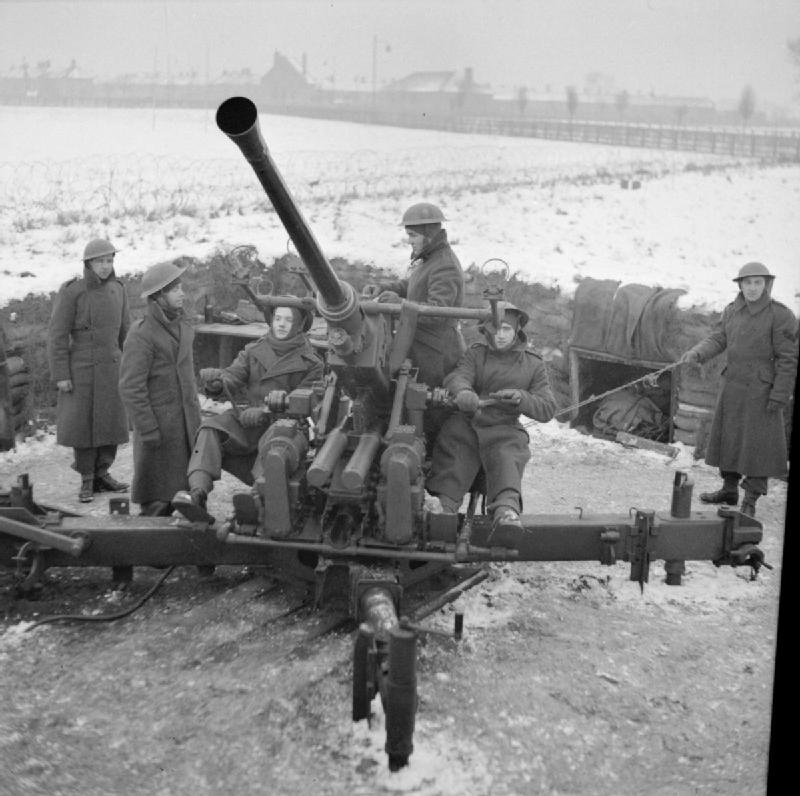
Bofors 40 mm LAA gun deployed 1942

- 129th (Mixed) HAA Rgt – formed August 1941
  - 444, 445, 454, 455 (M) HAA Btys
- 158th (Mixed) HAA Rgt – formed May, joined August 1942
  - 540, 541, 548, 572 (M) HAA Btys
- 19th LAA Rgt – from Orkney & Shetland Defences (OSDEF) June 1941; to 54th (East Anglian) Infantry Division February 1942
  - 54 LAA Bty – left Summer 1941
  - 60, 104 LAA Btys
  - 263 LAA Bty – joined Summer 1941
- 20th LAA Rgt – from 9 AA Division Spring 1942; left AA Command June 1942, later 21st Army Group
  - 62, 63, 244 LAA Btys
- 31st LAA Rgt – left June 1941
  - 61, 101, 224 LAA Btys
- 72nd LAA Rgt – from 7 AA Division Summer 1941; to 9 AA Division Spring 1942
  - 212. 213, 217 LAA Btys

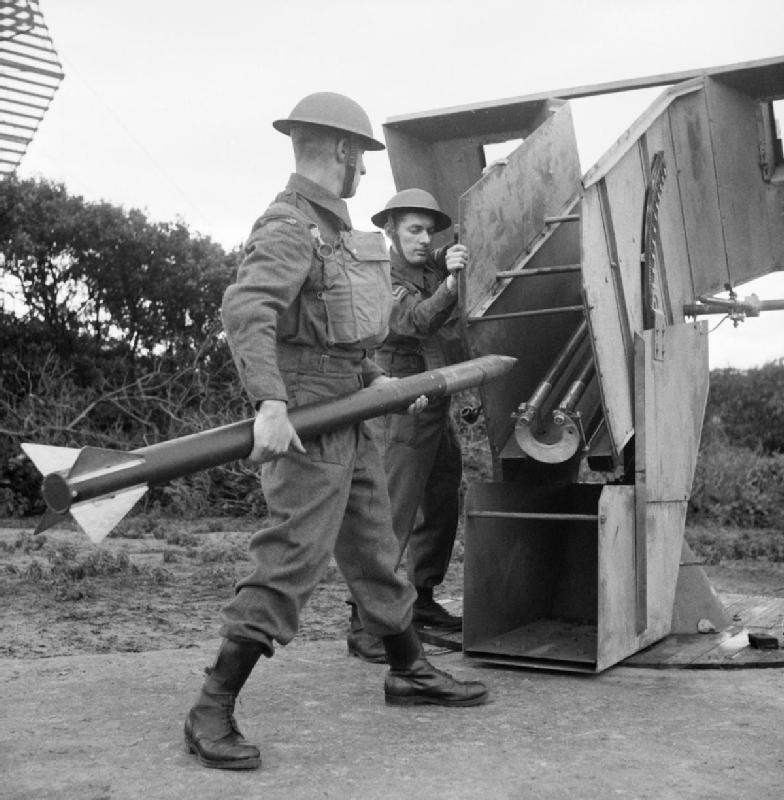
Home Guard soldiers load a single launcher on a static 'Z' Battery, July 1942

- 95th LAA Rgt – from 51 AA Bde June 1942
  - 263, 294, 297, 302, 446 LAA Btys
- 135th LAA Rgt – formed February 1942; to 52 AA Bde June 1942
  - 94, 445, 460, 478 LAA Btys
  - 478 LAA Bty – to 114th HAA Rgt May 1942
  - 450 LAA Bty – joined May 1942
- 46th (Lincolnshire Regiment) S/L Rgt – from 7 AA Division January 1942; to OSDEF August 1942
  - 382, 383, 384, 385 S/L Btys
- 59th (Warwickshire) S/L Rgt
  - 399, 427, 428, 516 S/L Btys
- 3rd AA 'Z' Rgt – to 12 AA Division September 1941; returned May 1942; designated Mixed May 1943
  - 107, 115, 118, 191 Z Btys
- 36 AA Bde Mixed Signal Office Section, part of 1 Company, 3 AA Division Mixed Signal Unit, Royal Corps of Signals (RCS)

== Later war ==
In August 1942, 3rd AA Division HQ moved south to help AA Command control the reinforcements to countering the Luftwaffe 'hit-and-run' raids against the South Coast, and the brigade briefly came under the command of 7th AA Division. However, in October 1942 AA Command reorganised its structure, replacing the AA Divisions with AA Groups coinciding with RAF Fighter Command's Groups. 36 AA Bde came under 6 AA Group covering Scotland.

=== Order of Battle 1942–44 ===
During this period the brigade was constituted as follows (temporary attachments omitted):

- 122nd HAA Rgt – from OSDEF November 1943
  - 397, 400, 401, 453 HAA Btys
- 129th (M) HAA Rgt – to 43 AA Bde April 1943

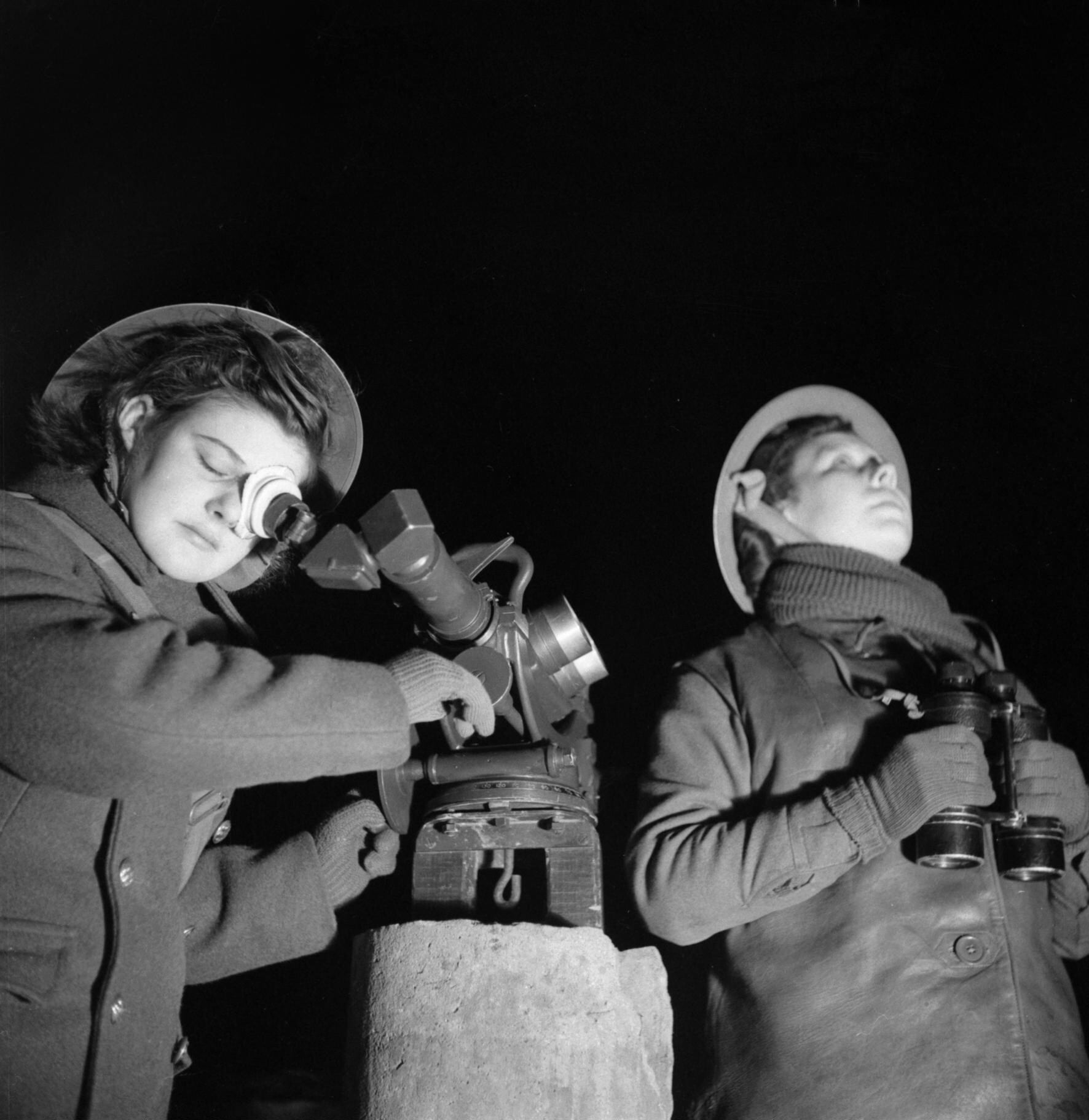
ATS spotters at a 3.7-inch gun site at Dunfermline, Scotland, 6 January 1943.

- 145th (M) HAA Rgt – from 43 AA Bde April 1943
  - 500, 501, 502, 536 (M) HAA Btys
- 158th (M) HAA Rgt – to 51 AA Bde Summer 1943
- 180th (M) HAA Rgt – from 42 AA Bde November 1943
  - 547, 586, 609, 613 (M) HAA Btys
- 85th LAA Rgt – from 51 AA Bde November 1943
  - 52, 56, 304 LAA Btys
- 95th LAA Rgt
  - 263, 294, 297, 302 LAA Btys
- 151st LAA Rgt – converted from 114th HAA Rgt (above); to 2 AA Group May 1943
  - 449, 478 LAA Btys
- 59th (Warwickshire) S/L Rgt – left for conversion to 148 (Warwickshire) LAA Rgt April 1943
  - 399, 427, 428 S/L Btys
  - 516 S/L Bty – disbanded February 1943
- 3 AA 'Z' Rgt
  - 107, 115 Z Btys – to 11 AA Z Rgt Winter 1942–3
  - 118 Z Bty
  - 191 Z Bty – unregimented January 1943
  - 208, 217, 218 Z Btys – new batteries joined December 1942
- 36 AA Bde Mixed Signal Office Section. part of 1 Mixed Signal Company, 6 AA Group Signals, RCS

== Disbandment ==
By early 1944, AA Command was being forced to release manpower to 21st Army Group for the planned Allied invasion of continental Europe (Operation Overlord), and a number of AA batteries, regiments and formations had to be disbanded. 36th (Scottish) AA Brigade was one of those to be disbanded, on 20 February 1944. 6 AA Group HQ went south to take over part of the responsibility for defending the Overlord embarkation ports, and a new 8 AA Group was formed to cover Scotland. 122nd HAA Regiment went to Southern England with 6 AA Group and joined 30 AA Bde while the rest of 36 AA Bde's units joined the new 8 AA Group.

== Postwar ==
When the TA was reformed in 1947, 36 AA Bde's Regular Army units reformed 12 AA Bde, while the TA portion was renumbered as 62 AA Bde, (Note: The TA AA brigades were now numbered 51 and upwards, rather than 26 and upwards as in the 1930s; the wartime 62nd AA Bde was disbanded in 1945.) both at South Queensferry and forming part of the Edinburgh-based 3 AA Group. 62 AA Brigade had the following composition:

- 494 (City of Edinburgh) HAA Rgt (ex 94 HAA Rgt) – see above
- 514 (West Lothian, Royal Scots) LAA Rgt (ex 14 LAA Rgt from 51 Light AA Bde)
- 519 (Dunedin) LAA Rgt (ex 19 LAA Rgt from 51 Light AA Bde)
- 532 LAA Rgt (ex 32 LAA Rgt) – see above
- 587 (Queen's Edinburgh, Royal Scots) LAA Rgt (ex 52 Searchlight Rgt, later 130 LAA Rgt, from 52 Light AA Bde)

However, the reformed brigade was short-lived, being disbanded in September 1948.

== External sources ==
- British Army units from 1945 on
- British Military History
- Orders of Battle at Patriot Files
- The Royal Artillery 1939–45
