= 32nd Light Anti-Aircraft Regiment, Royal Artillery =

Scottish air defence unit

32nd Light Anti-Aircraft Regiment, RA 532 Light Anti-Aircraft Regiment, RA
- Cap badge of the Royal Artillery
- Active: 28 August 1939– 30 September 1950
- Country: United Kingdom
- Branch: Territorial Army
- Role: Air defence
- Size: Regiment
- Part of: Anti-Aircraft Command; 7th AA Brigade; 107th AA Brigade
- Garrison/HQ: Falkirk
- Engagements: The Blitz; Siege of Malta; Siege of Dunkirk; Rhine crossing

The 32nd Light Anti-Aircraft Regiment, Royal Artillery, (32nd LAA Rgt) was a Scottish air defence unit of Britain's Territorial Army (TA) during World War II. After serving with Anti-Aircraft Command in the defence of the UK, it went to Malta and served for two years in the defence of the besieged island. It then landed in Normandy in August 1944 and fought through the campaign in North West Europe, notably at the Siege of Dunkirk, where it was used in a siege gun role, and in the crossing of the Rhine, until VE Day. The regiment was reformed in the postwar TA but was amalgamated with other Scottish anti-aircraft units in 1950.

== Origin ==
The regiment was formed as part of the rapid expansion of Britain's anti-aircraft (AA) defences at the beginning of World War II. Regimental Headquarters (RHQ) was formed at Falkirk, Stirlingshire, on 28 August 1939 as the Territorial Army (TA) was being mobilised for war. The regiment was assembled around 55 LAA Battery transferred from the Glasgow-based 18th LAA Rgt. 55 Battery had been formed on 30 June incorporating 144 Independent LAA Troop, which itself had been formed on 1 December 1938 from Territorial Army Reserve (TAR) personnel. The new regiment was also joined by the newly formed 98 and 103 LAA Btys, giving the following initial organisation:

- Regimental Headquarters (RHQ) at Falkirk
- 55 LAA Bty at Rosyth Dockyard
  - 144 Troop at Irvine, North Ayrshire
- 98 LAA Bty at Falkirk
  - 265 Troop at Portobello, Edinburgh
  - 266 Troop at Dreur
- 103 LAA Bty:
  - 277 and 278 Troops at Bishopton Royal Ordnance Factory
  - 278 and 280 Troops at Kilmarnock

The prewar LAA troops had been created in late 1938 to defend vulnerable points (VPs) such as factories, the guns being manned by shifts of workers from the sites. With the need to move gunsites and the unpopularity of the TAR amongst employers they had been replaced by normal TA members who were liable for fulltime service in the event of war. 32nd LAA Regiment relieved the TAR troops at the Ardeer explosives factory on 19 November 1939. AA units in Scotland were controlled by 3rd AA Division, which in August 1939 formed 51st Light Anti-Aircraft Brigade in Edinburgh, originally to command the division's LAA units but it later assumed full responsibility for the AA defences of North East Scotland. At the outbreak of World War II the Bofors 40 mm gun was in short supply, and LAA units had to make do with a range of stop-gap weapons. 3rd AA Division had a few 3-inch guns, but most LAA sites only had Light machine guns.

== World War II ==
=== Phoney War and Blitz ===
Unlike most of Britain's defence forces, 3rd AA Division was frequently in action during the so-called Phoney War that lasted from September 1939 to May 1940. The first action occurred unexpectedly on 16 October 1939, when nine enemy aircraft suddenly appeared out of cloud and dived on warships off Rosyth Dockyard, close to the Forth Bridge; they were engaged by heavy AA (HAA) guns. There were calls for stronger AA defences for the Scottish naval bases, but although HAA guns and searchlights (S/Ls) began to be delivered from January 1940, only 10 Bofors and a few Royal Navy 2-pounder pom-poms were made available to 3rd AA Division.

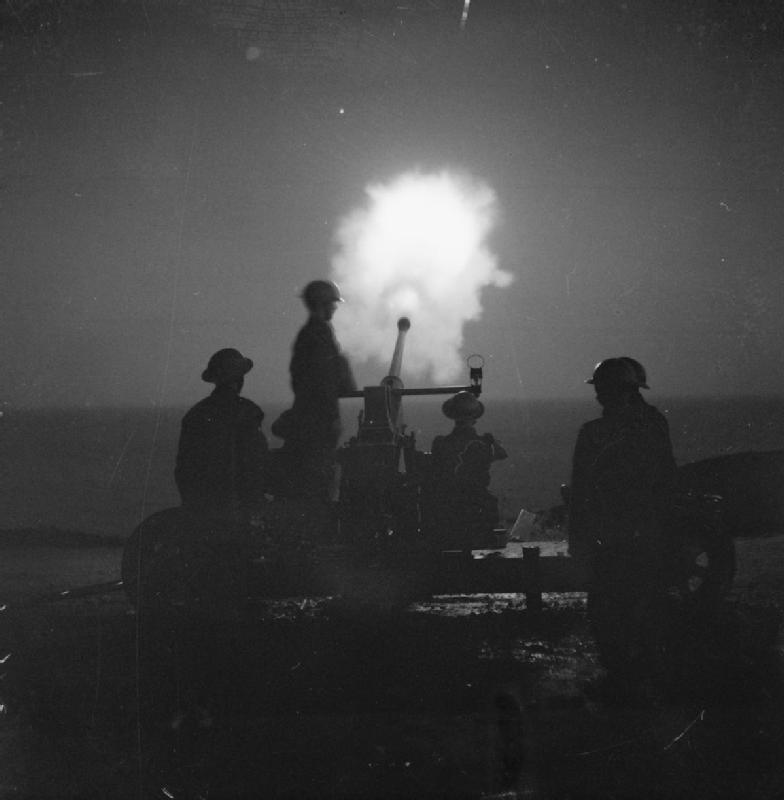
Bofors gun firing at a practice camp, April 1941.

By the autumn of 1940, when the Luftwaffe 's night Blitz against Britain's cities began, the regiment had transferred to 36th (Scottish) Anti-Aircraft Brigade covering Edinburgh and the Firth of Forth. 103 LAA Bty left the regiment to join 26th LAA Rgt on 14 February 1941, and was replaced on 10 March by 223 LAA Bty. This battery had been formed on 12 December 1940 by 213th LAA Training Rgt at Carlisle based on a cadre of experienced officers and men from 21st LAA Rgt.

The regiment left AA Command in mid-June 1941 and embarked under the command of Lt-Col H.J. King on a convoy bound for Malta.

=== Malta ===
The retention of Malta as an air and naval base was pivotal to Britain's Mediterranean strategy, but the island came under air attack from the day Italy entered the war (11 June 1940). At the time, the AA defences of the island consisted of 34 HAA guns and 8 LAA guns against the establishment of 112 HAA and 60 LAA that had been approved before the war by the Committee of Imperial Defence. In late 1940 the War Office managed to send some AA reinforcements, even though the Blitz was raging at the time. After the first attacks in June 1940, air raids on Malta had dwindled, but in January 1941 the intensity increased markedly when the German Luftwaffe sent Fliegerkorps X to join the Italian Regia Aeronautica to neutralise the island. Fliegerkorps X was based on airfields in Sicily, only 20 minutes' flying time away. It began a series of heavy bombing raids, mainly at night, accompanied by mine-dropping in and around Grand Harbour. There were often several air raids a day, rising to a peak of 62 raids in the month May, but thereafter the Luftwaffe units were withdrawn for the invasion of the Soviet Union (Operation Barbarossa).

The Regia Aeronautica continued its raids and the Battle of Crete was won by combined air and sea landings on 1 June led to fears that Malta would be next, so further reinforcements including the 32nd LAA Rgt were sent out in Operation Substance. The convoy consisted of one troopship and six merchant ships, with a large escort of warships. It passed through the Straits of Gibraltar on 20 July; unfortunately the troopship ran aground, so only the troops embarked on the freighters and warships could continue. This included the 32nd LAA Rgt with 58 new Bofors guns, of which 10 were mounted on the merchant ships for AA defence. Air attacks on the convoy began on the morning of 23 July, but although some of the escorting warships were sunk or damaged the convoy continued. During the night there was an attack by Italian motor torpedo boats, which hit one of the merchant ships. The troops aboard were transferred to escort vessels and the convoy, including the damaged ship, reached Grand Harbour on the morning of 24 July. The men left at Gibraltar or aboard the damaged escorts, were brought to the island aboard fast warships on 31 July.

The role of LAA guns on Malta was to defend the Royal Air Force (RAF) airfields and Royal Navy (RN) dockyard against low level air attacks. With the arrival of the 32nd LAA Rgt there were 118 LAA guns on the island, the increase over the original establishment being required to defend the expanded airfields. These now consisted of three airfields, with an additional landing strip connected with two of them by taxiway, with numerous aircraft dispersal pens. By the time the 32nd LAA Rgt arrived it was arranged that all LAA and seachlight units on the island were under the 7th AA Brigade and the 10th AA Brigade commanded the HAA sites.

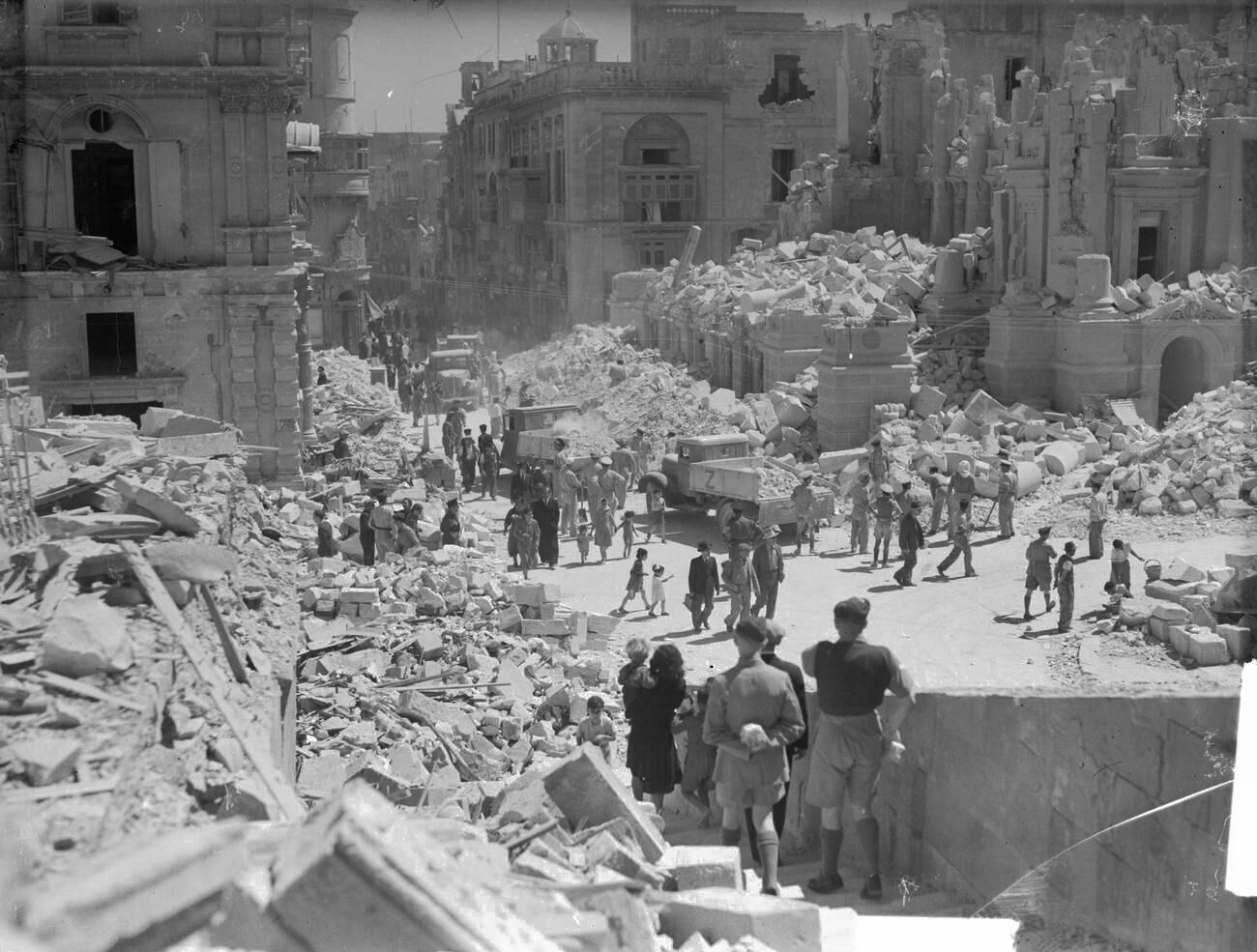
Service personnel and civilians clear up debris on a bomb-damaged street in Valletta, Malta, on 1 May 1942.

Malta was largely left alone during the summer of 1941 but attacks resumed in November after Fliegerkorps II arrived in Sicily. Air raids increased in November and December, and rations and supplies on the island began to run short. Almost continuous attacks went on through early 1942, particularly aimed at airfields, shipping and port installations. Heavy raids were made by the Luftwaffe in daylight while smaller harassing raids were made by the Regia Aeronautica. The ammunition expenditure – and success rate – of the AA guns climbed as the raids increased. The Luftwaffe turned to Flak suppression attacking the AA positions with bombs and machine guns, and several sites were hit. The batteries changed sites frequently, created dummy sites, and often withheld their fire until the last moment. Gun sites also used self-defence barrages, such as 'Porcupine', which produced a ring of shell bursts above the guns at a variety of heights. By June, the size of night raids had grown to 90+ aircraft, while day raids (the main LAA target) were as few as eight aircraft. These raids were aimed at RAF airfields, but the raiders lost heavily and the scale of attacks dwindled in July. In the first week in August only seven bombers approached the island, the lowest number for several months. Out at sea, the vital supply convoys came under heavy attack and suffered serious losses of ships and cargoes. The survivors of the Operation Pedestal convoy fought their way through the island between 13 and 15 August with sufficient supplies to prolong the defence until December.

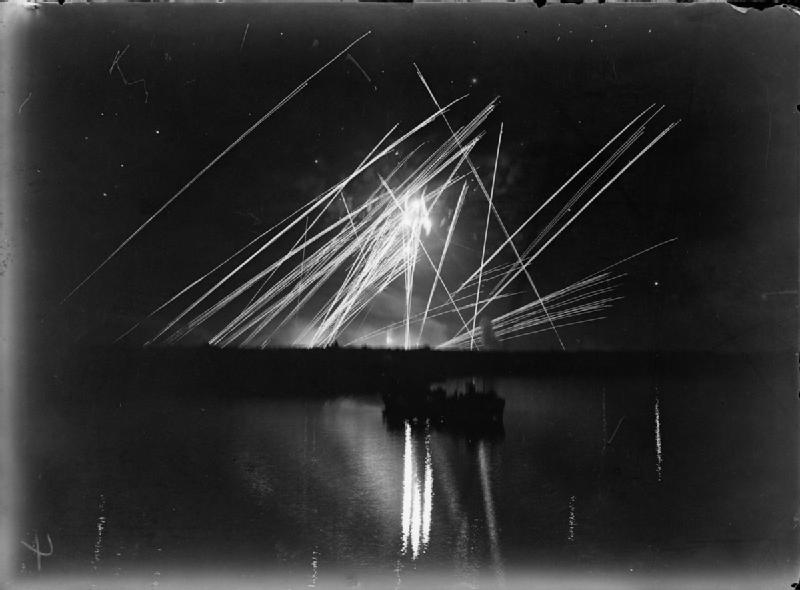
Searchlights and tracer fire over Grand Harbour during a night air raid.

In October the Luftwaffe reinforced Fliegerkorps II, and a new round of heavy raids against the island began to restrict the RAF and RN's ability to interdict Axis convoys to Libya. The raiders employed new low-level tactics that lost heavily to the AA guns and RAF fighters. At this period, the 36 Bofors guns of 32nd LAA Rgt were deployed to defend Grand Harbour and the city of Valletta. By now there were shortages of food and supplies on the island, but a supply convoy got through in November. With the recent Axis defeat at Alamein and Operation Torch the North Africa landings the same month, the siege of Malta was ended. The only enemy air activity for the rest of the year was occasional high-flying reconnaissances and one raid on Luqa airfield in December. In January 1943 raids were reduced to occasional fighter sweeps, and in February no aircraft crossed the coastline at all.

In May 1943, Axis aircraft reappeared to disrupt preparations for the Allied invasion of Sicily (Operation Husky) but by now the AA defences of Malta had been hugely increased and the raids caused little damage. After the Surrender of Italy on 8 September 1943 the defences of Malta were reduced. Lt-Col H.J. King was promoted to command the 7th AA Bde in January 1944 and Lt-Col B.B. Wilson took over as commanding officer of the 32nd LAA Rgt on 12 January 1944; the regiment left the island in March.

=== North West Europe ===
On return to the UK, 32nd LAA Rgt was assigned to 107th Anti-Aircraft Brigade in 21st Army Group preparing for the Allied invasion of Normandy (Operation Overlord). The assault landings began on 6 June 1944 (D-Day), but 107th AA Bde was not scheduled to embark for several weeks. A week after D-Day, the Germans began their long-expected offensive against southern England with V-1 flying bombs (codenamed 'Divers'). AA Command immediately put Operation Diver into effect, and the uncommitted AA units of 21st Army Group massed in southern England lent their assistance to try to shoot down the missiles.

As the Normandy campaign progressed, 107th AA Bde eventually embarked, arriving in the beachhead area between 6 and 19 August and joining First Canadian Army. Shortly afterwards the breakout from the Normandy beachhead began, and First Canadian Army began advancing eastwards. II Canadian Corps passed through Lisieux and forced crossings of the River Risle, with bridging sites at Pont-Audemer, Pont-Authou and Brionne. Following up, 107th AA Bde's units were deployed on 25 August to protect Lisieux and the bridges. Next the Canadians liberated Dieppe, and 223 LAA Bty of 32nd LAA Rgt was deployed there on 2 September. On 4 September the brigade moved up to Abbeville and the bridges over the River Somme. Throughout these advances, attacks by the Luftwaffe were surprisingly light while its units were being forced to redeploy as their airfields were captured.

107th AA Brigade's units along the Somme were relieved on 15 September, and they moved up behind First Canadian Army, whose role now was to liberate the Channel ports. 107th AA Bde was briefly deployed at Boulogne, which was besieged from 12 to 22 September, and then moved up on 17 September to Dunkirk, which Hitler had declared a 'fortress'. Here, 32nd LAA Rgt, along with 109th HAA Rgt and 149th LAA Rgt, was deployed round the perimeter of the besieged town. Next day, the guns began bombardment tasks against the defenders, with the brigade AA Operations Room acting in the role of a field artillery fire control centre, providing the communications network and planning fire programmes. On the first day the three regiments fired 576 rounds of HAA ammunition and 1332 Bofors rounds. For the next five months the brigade remained in these positions acting as an Army Group Royal Artillery in the ground support role, only occasionally called on to provide AA fire. The brigade was reinforced by a Canadian HAA regiment and field artillery regiments as the daily bombardments increased in scale. The usefulness of the Bofors gun for ground support and 'bunker-busting' had been noted during the Normandy campaign. Now ammunition expenditure peaked at 5–6000 Bofors rounds per day, the usual targets being enemy gun positions, bunkers, ammunition dumps and likely HQs and observation posts. However, no deliberate assault was attempted, the besieging force (latterly the 1st Czechoslovak Armoured Brigade and French units) being ordered simply to 'mask' Dunkirk and harass its defenders. Early in October a truce was called to allow the civilians to be evacuated. In mid-October the Luftwaffe began trying to supply the defenders by parachute drops at night, using Heinkel He 111 bombers approaching at very low level to try to avoid detection. To counter these attempts LAA guns and searchlights were the best answer, and additional LAA and LAA/SL units were added to the brigade's ring. Between 15 October and 12 January 1945, the Luftwaffe attempted 18 drops during which 58 aircraft were plotted on radar, and seven were shot down.

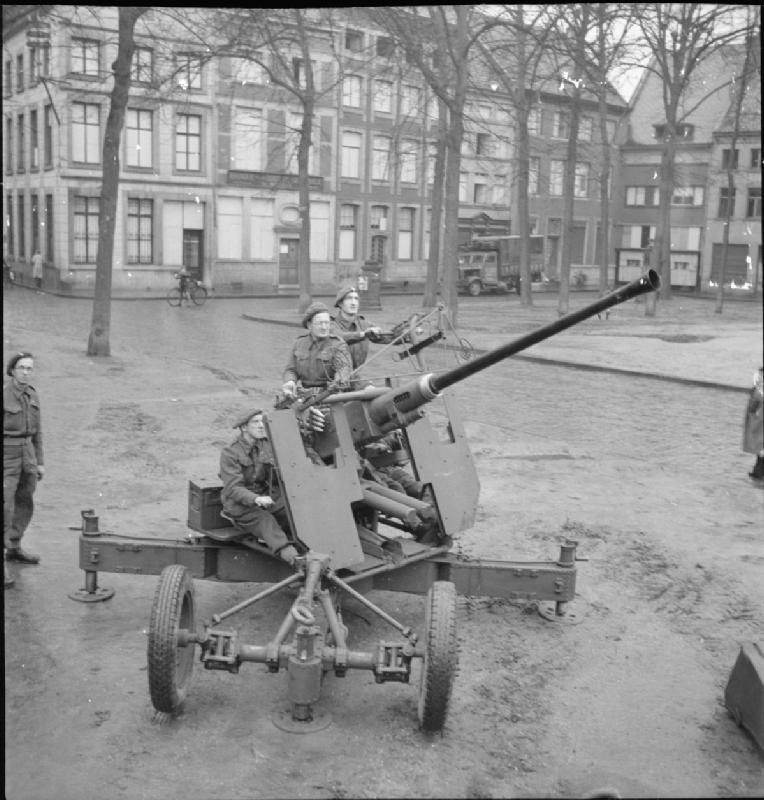
Bofors gun and crew deployed in North West Europe.

107th AA Brigade was released from its commitments at Dunkirk to rejoin First Canadian Army in the Netherlands in mid-February. It was then given a role in preparing for the crossing of the Rhine (Operation Plunder) under II Canadian Corps. After British Second Army had carried out an assault crossing, II Canadian Corps would cross and assume responsibility for the bridging operations at Emmerich am Rhein and exploitation northwards. During the build-up, the main AA responsibility was to protect the lines of communication and supply dumps as far back as the River Maas. On 18 March 107th AA Bde arrived and took over responsibility for Kleve, Gennep and the Maas bridges at Mook en Middelaar, with 223 LAA Bty detached as part of this deployment. There were a few low-level 'snap' raids by single aircraft over II Canadian Corps' area, but otherwise the Luftwaffe made little attempt to disrupt the preparations. 'Plunder' was launched on the night of 23/24 March, followed by an airborne assault (Operation Varsity), and the bridging began immediately. The Luftwaffe did send over a few scattered night raids on bridging sites, artillery areas and supply routes. Part of 107th AA Bde took over defence of the Emmerich bridging on D + 4 (27 March) but 32nd LAA Rgt was still on the approach routes back to Mook. The spearhead units of II Canadian Corps crossed on 28/29 March and began fighting their way out of Emmerich.

During April, 107th AA Bde advanced through the North Netherlands and Germany with First Canadian Army, crossing the Twente Canal and reaching Oldenburg, Groningen and the Frisian coast by the end of the month. There was plenty of hard fighting but, unlike Second Army's advance, there was no interference from the air. The Canadians then moved on to secure the German ports such as Wilhelmshaven. The German surrender at Lüneburg Heath came on 4 May, and hostilities ended the next day.

The units of 21st Army Group in Germany then began undertaking occupation duties while awaiting demobilisation. 32nd Light Anti-Aircraft Regiment was still serving with British Army of the Rhine when it, together with 55, 98 and 223 LAA Btys, entered suspended animation between 4 and 25 February 1946.

== Postwar ==
When the TA was reconstituted on 1 January 1947, the regiment reformed at Falkirk as 532 LAA Regiment. It formed part of 62 AA Bde (the old 36th (Scottish) AA Bde), based at South Queensferry.

However, on 30 September 1950 the regiment amalgamated with 540th LAA Rgt at Inverness and 677 (Lovat Scouts) Mountain Rgt at Inverness to form 532 (Lovat Scouts) LAA Rgt (which adopted the number 540 in 1954).

== Insignia ==
At some point after 1941 the regiment adopted an embroidered regimental flash consisting of a dark blue shield with a red Maltese cross superimposed on the white Saltire of Scotland, symbolising its Scottish origins and service in Malta.

== Notes ==
- Maj L.F. Ellis, History of the Second World War, United Kingdom Military Series: Victory in the West, Vol I: The Battle of Normandy, London: HM Stationery Office, 1962/Uckfield: Naval & Military, 2004, ISBN 1-845740-58-0.
- Maj L.F. Ellis, History of the Second World War, United Kingdom Military Series: Victory in the West, Vol II: The Defeat of Germany, London: HM Stationery Office, 1968/Uckfield: Naval & Military, 2004, ISBN 1-845740-59-9.
- Gen Sir Martin Farndale, History of the Royal Regiment of Artillery: The Years of Defeat: Europe and North Africa, 1939–1941, Woolwich: Royal Artillery Institution, 1988/London: Brasseys, 1996, ISBN 1-85753-080-2.
- J.B.M. Frederick, Lineage Book of British Land Forces 1660–1978, Vol II, Wakefield: Microform Academic, 1984, ISBN 1-85117-009-X.
- Joslen, H. F. (2003) [1960]. Orders of Battle: Second World War, 1939–1945. Uckfield, East Sussex: Naval and Military Press. ISBN 978-1-84342-474-1.
- Norman E.H. Litchfield, The Territorial Artillery 1908–1988 (Their Lineage, Uniforms and Badges), Nottingham: Sherwood Press, 1992, ISBN 0-9508205-2-0.
- Maj-Gen I.S.O. Playfair, History of the Second World War, United Kingdom Military Series: The Mediterranean and Middle East, Vol I: The Early Successes against Italy (to May 1941), London: HM Stationery Office, 1954/Uckfield, Naval & Military Press, 2004 ISBN 1-845740-65-3.
- Maj-Gen I.S.O. Playfair, History of the Second World War, United Kingdom Military Series: The Mediterranean and Middle East, Vol II: The Germans come to the aid of their Ally (1941), London: HM Stationery Office, 1956/Uckfield, Naval & Military Press, 2004 ISBN 1-845740-66-1.
- Maj-Gen I.S.O. Playfair, History of the Second World War, United Kingdom Military Series: The Mediterranean and Middle East, Vol III: (September 1941 to September 1942) British Fortunes reach their Lowest Ebb, London: HM Stationery Office, 1960 /Uckfield, Naval & Military Press, 2004, ISBN 1-845740-67-X
- Maj-Gen I.S.O. Playfair & Brig C.J.C. Molony, History of the Second World War, United Kingdom Military Series: The Mediterranean and Middle East, Vol IV: The Destruction of the Axis forces in Africa, London: HM Stationery Office, 1966/Uckfield, Naval & Military Press, 2004, ISBN 1-845740-68-8.
- Denis Rollo, The Guns and Gunners of Malta, Malta: Mondial, 1999, ISBN 99909-68-84-5.
- Brig N.W. Routledge, History of the Royal Regiment of Artillery: Anti-Aircraft Artillery 1914–55, London: Royal Artillery Institution/Brassey's, 1994, ISBN 1-85753-099-3.
- Col C.P. Stacey, Official History of the Canadian Army in the Second World War, Vol III: The Victory Campaign – The Operations in North-West Europe 1944–1945, Ottawa: Queen's Printer & Controller of Stationery, 1960. Archived 21 December 2020 at the Wayback Machine

== External sources ==
- British Army units 1945 on
- Orders of Battle at Patriot Files
- Graham Watson, The Territorial Army 1947 Archived 9 December 2021 at the Wayback Machine
