= 54th Anti-Aircraft Brigade =

54th Anti-Aircraft Brigade 80 Anti-Aircraft Brigade
- Active: 1 September 1939–28 November 1943; 1 January 1947 – 9 September 1948
- Country: United Kingdom
- Branch: Territorial Army
- Type: Anti-Aircraft Brigade
- Role: Air Defence
- Part of: 4th AA Division; 11th AA Division; 4th AA Group
- Garrison/HQ: Sutton Coldfield
- Engagements: Coventry Blitz; Birmingham Blitz

The 54th Anti-Aircraft Brigade was an air defence formation of Britain's Territorial Army (TA) formed immediately before the outbreak of the Second World War. It was engaged in defending the West Midlands of England during the war. It comprised a varying number of searchlight (S/L) battalions and later included light anti-aircraft units. It was disbanded at the end of 1943. When the TA was reconstituted in 1947, the former 54th AA Bde was reformed as 80 Anti-Aircraft Brigade but was disbanded on 9 September 1948.

== Mobilisation ==
As tensions rose at the time of the Munich Crisis, Britain's AA defences were strengthened and 4th AA Division was formed in 1938 within Western Command. In 1939 all TA AA formations, comprising units of the Royal Artillery (RA) and Royal Engineers (RE), were brought under a new Anti-Aircraft Command covering the whole country. On the outbreak of war a new 54th AA Brigade was being formed in 4 AA Division to provide searchlight cover straddling the South Midlands Area of Southern Command and the West Lancashire Area of Western Command. The brigade was formally raised on 1 September 1939 at Sutton Coldfield near Birmingham. Its units had already mobilised on 22 August.

=== Order of Battle 1939–40 ===
On formation the brigade had the following composition:

- 41st (5th North Staffordshire Regiment) AA Battalion, RE – infantry battalion converted to searchlights in 1936
  - HQ 362–365 AA Cos at Stoke-on-Trent
- 45th (The Royal Warwickshire Regiment) AA Bn, RE – infantry battalion converted to searchlights in 1936
  - HQ, 378–382 AA Cos at Thorpe Street, Birmingham
- 59th (Warwickshire) Searchlight Regiment, RA – new unit formed from a battery of 45 AA Bn in 1938
  - HQ, 399, 427, 428 Btys at Birmingham
- 61st (South Lancashire Regiment) Searchlight Regiment, RA – infantry battalion converted to searchlights in 1938
  - HQ, 432–434 Btys at St Helens

== Battle of Britain and Blitz ==
On 1 August 1940 the AA battalions of the RE were transferred to the RA, in which they were designated 'Searchlight Regiments'.

There were numerous small raids on the West Midlands during the Battle of Britain, including one on the night of 26/27 August when the officers' mess of 54 AA Bde received a direct hit that wrecked the building without causing any casualties.

In the reorganisation of AA Command in November 1940, 54 AA Bde assumed responsibility for searchlight provision for the Gun Defence Areas of the West Midlands under a new 11th AA Division. At this time it only had two regiments under command: 45th (Royal Warwicks) and 80th, a new regiment raised in October 1940.

=== Coventry Blitz ===
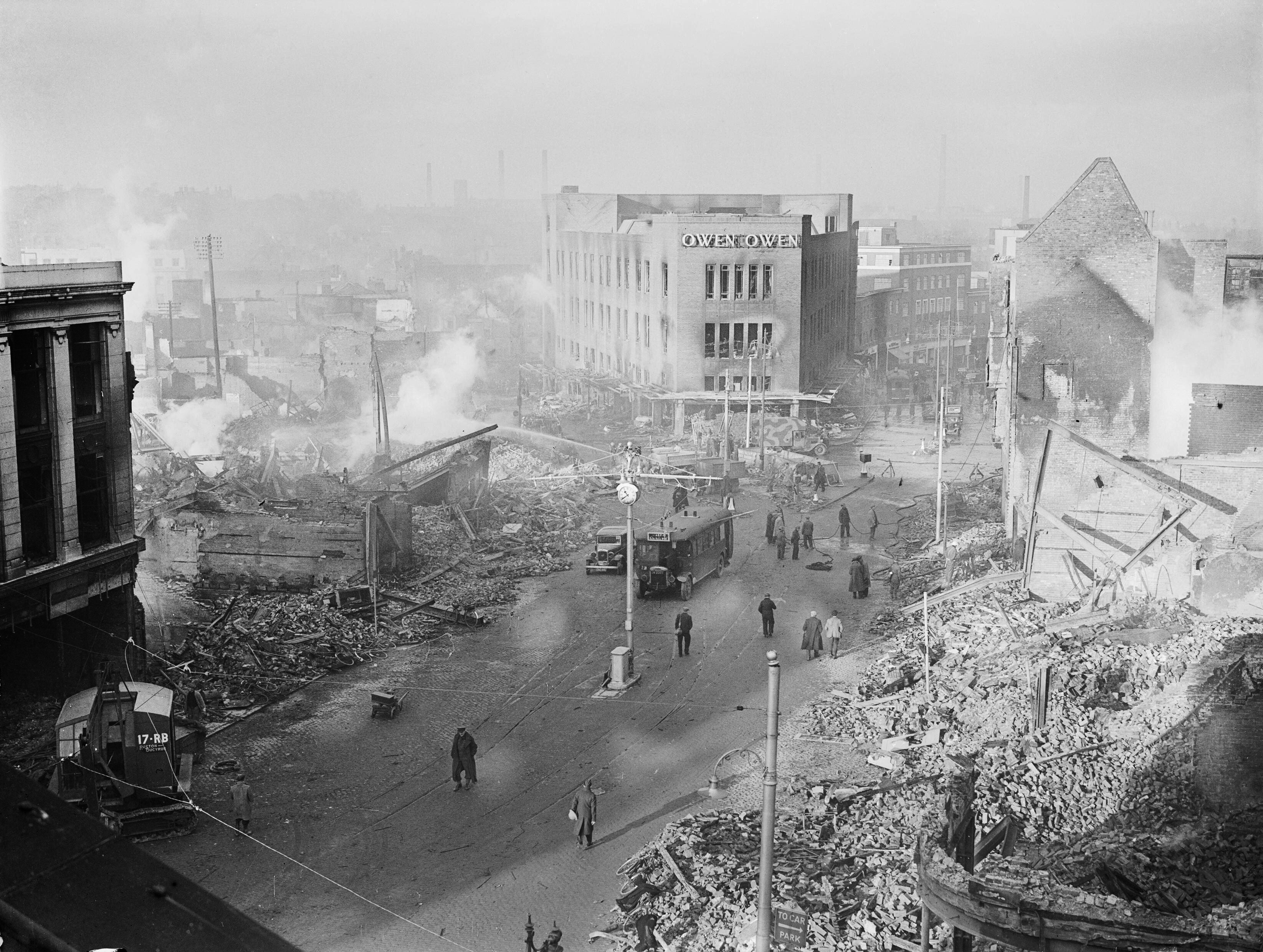
Coventry city centre following 14 November air raid.

The new division was still being formed when the Luftwaffe launched a series of devastating raids, beginning with the notorious Coventry Blitz on 14/15 November. The Coventry raid was preceded by a dozen pathfinder aircraft of Kampfgeschwader 100 riding an X-Gerät beam to drop flares and incendiary bombs on the target. The huge fires that broke out in the congested city centre then attracted successive 40-strong waves of bombers flying at heights between 12,000 and 20,000 feet to saturate the defences. The AA Defence Commander had prepared a series of concentrations to be fired using sound-locators and GL Mk. I gun-laying radar, but the bombing severed all lines of communication and the noise drowned out sound-location. Some gun positions were able to fire at searchlight beam intersections, glimpsed through the smoke and guessing the range. The Coventry raid was followed by three consecutive nights (19–22 November) of attacks on Birmingham and other Black Country industrial towns including West Bromwich, Dudley and Tipton. The change in enemy tactics led to additional AA units being moved to the West Midlands.

=== Birmingham Blitz ===
Birmingham was bombed again during December (3, 4, 11) and on 11 March 1941, but the full Birmingham Blitz came in April 1941, with heavy raids on the nights of 9/10 and 10/11 of the month, causing extensive damage and casualties.

The Blitz is generally held to have ended on 16 May 1941 with another attack on Birmingham. By now the HAA sites had the advantage of GL Mk I* radar with an elevation finding (E/F or 'Effie') attachment to supplement searchlights, and several attackers were turned away by accurate fire and their bombs scattered widely, some on nearby Nuneaton. The city was attacked again in July, but the Luftwaffe bombing offensive was effectively over. The West Midlands had been the hardest hit area of the UK after London and Merseyside.

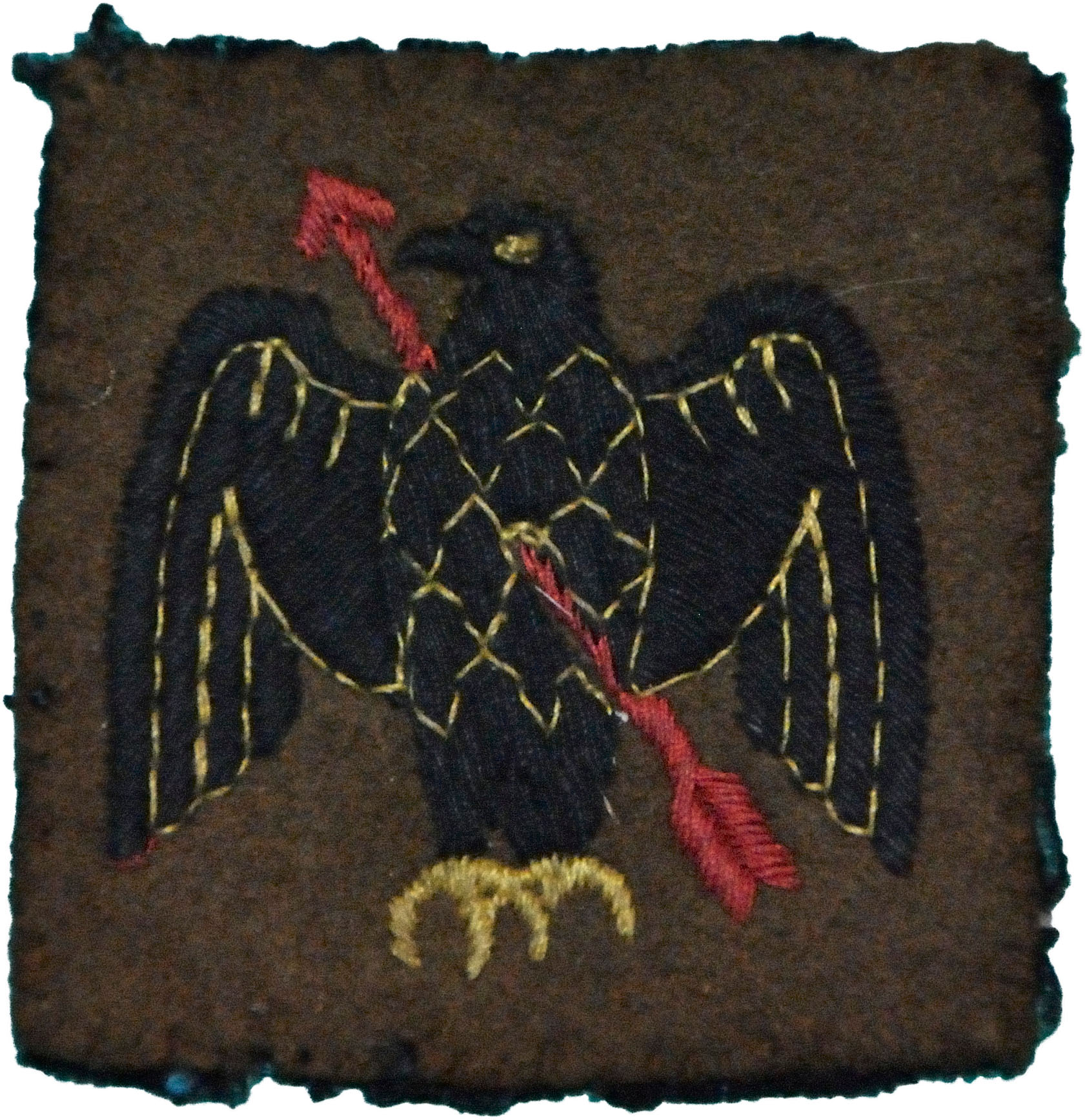
Formation sign of 11 AA Division

=== Order of Battle 1941 ===
The brigade's composition by the end of the Blitz was as follows:

- 45th (Royal Warwicks) S/L Rgt
  - 378, 379, 380, 381 Btys
- 59th (Warwickshire) S/L Rgt – to Orkney and Shetland Defences (OSDEF) May 1941
  - 399, 427, 428 Btys
- 80th S/L Rgt
  - 505, 506, 507 Btys
- 83rd S/L Rgt – from 68 AA Bde Summer 1941
  - 513, 514, 515 Btys

== Mid-war ==
In the summer of 1941, AA Command began to receive purpose-built searchlight control (SLC of 'Elsie') radar in sufficient numbers to allow some S/Ls to be 'declustered' into single-light sites. These were redeployed into 'Indicator Belts' of radar-controlled S/L clusters covering approaches to the RAF's night-fighter sectors, repeated by similar belts covering AA Command's Gun Defence Areas (GDAs). Inside each belt was a 20-mile deep 'Killer Belt' of single S/Ls spaced at 6,000 yards (5,500 m) intervals in a 'Killer Belt' cooperating with night-fighters patrolling defined 'boxes'. The pattern was designed to ensure that raids penetrating deeply towards the Midlands GDAs would cross more than one belt, and the GDAs had more S/Ls at close spacing. The number of LAA units to protect VPs was growing, albeit slowly.

By now, additional Bofors LAA guns began to arrive in quantity to defend vulnerable points (VPs) and as a light AA Bde, 54th now began to receive LAA gun units in addition to its S/Ls.

At this stage of the war, experienced units were being posted away to train for service overseas. This led to a continual turnover of units, which accelerated with the preparations for the invasion of North Africa (Operation Torch) in late 1942, and the need to transfer LAA units to deal with the Luftwaffe's 'hit-and run' raids on the South Coast. However, newly formed units continued to join AA Command, the HAA and support units increasingly becoming 'Mixed' units, indicating that women of the Auxiliary Territorial Service (ATS) were fully integrated into them.

=== Order of Battle 1941–42 ===
During this period the brigade was composed as follows (temporary attachments omitted):

- 22nd LAA Rgt – from 34 (South Midland) AA Bde June 1942; to War Office Control August 1942; later to Operation Torch
  - 70, 72, 141 LAA Btys
- 111th LAA Rgt – from 2 AA Division July 1942; to 34 AA Bde May 1943
  - 348, 349, 350, 363 LAA Btys
- 128th LAA Rgt – from 67 AA Bde June 1942; to 68 AA Bde July 1942
  - 421, 422, 423, 424 LAA Btys
- 30th (Surrey) S/L Rgt – from 10 AA Division by May 1942; to WO Control August 1942; later to Operation Torch
  - 318, 323, 511, 567 S/L Btys
- 45th S/L Rgt – converted into 122nd LAA Rgt February 1942, joined 68 AA Bde May 1942
  - 378, 379, 380, 381 S/L Btys
- 67th (Welch) S/L Rgt – from 3 AA Group November 1942
  - 450, 451, 452 S/L Btys
- 80th S/L Rgt – to 3 AA Group September 1943
  - 505, 506, 507 S/L Btys
- 83rd S/L Rgt – to 2 AA Group September 1943
  - 365, 513, 514, 515 S/L Btys
- 54 AA Brigade Signal Office Mixed Sub-Section – part of No 2 Company 11 AA Division Mixed Signal Unit

== Later war ==
In October 1942 AA Command reorganised its structure, replacing the AA Divisions with AA Groups coinciding with RAF Fighter Command's Groups. 54 AA Bde came under 4 AA Group covering North-West England and North Wales.

After September 1943, 54 AA Bde only had one unit (67 S/L Rgt) under command, and the brigade HQ began disbanding at Knowle on 28 November, completing the process on 21 December.

== Postwar: change of designation ==
When the TA was reformed in 1947, the former 28th (Thames and Medway) Anti-Aircraft Brigade was renumbered as 54 Anti-Aircraft Brigade.

The previous 54th Brigade at Sutton Coldfield was redesignated 80 Anti-Aircraft Brigade (TA), which had no connection with the disbanded wartime 80th AA Bde. The brigade came under 4 AA Group with the following composition:

- 469 (Royal Warwickshire Regiment) Heavy Anti-Aircraft Regiment, RA at Kings Heath, Birmingham
- 495 (Birmingham) Heavy Anti-Aircraft Regiment, RA at Sheldon, Birmingham
- 580 (5th Bn The Royal Warwickshire Regiment) Heavy Anti-Aircraft Regiment, RA (the former 45 S/L Regiment) at Birmingham
- 594 (Warwickshire) Light Anti-Aircraft Regiment, RA (the former 59 S/L Regiment) at Birmingham

However, the brigade was disbanded on 9 September 1948.

== Online sources ==
- British Army units from 1945 on
- British Military History
- Orders of Battle at Patriot Files
- The Royal Artillery 1939–45
- Graham Watson, The Territorial Army 1947
