= 1st Searchlight Regiment, Royal Artillery =

1st Anti-Aircraft Battalion, Royal Engineers 1st Searchlight Regiment, Royal Artillery 78th Heavy Anti-Aircraft Regiment, Royal Artillery
- Active: 1920–1954
- Country: United Kingdom
- Branch: British Army
- Type: Searchlight Regiment
- Role: Air Defence
- Garrison/HQ: Blackdown Camp
- Engagements: Siege of Calais; Dunkirk evacuation Cardiff Blitz; Swansea Blitz; Baedeker Blitz; Baby Blitz; Operation Diver; Defence of Antwerp

The 1st Searchlight Regiment, Royal Artillery was an air defence unit of the British Army from 1920 until 1954. Originally formed in the Royal Engineers (RE), it was transferred to the Royal Artillery (RA) at the start of World War II. It fought with distinction in the defence of Calais during the Battle of France, in which it was virtually destroyed. Reformed, it helped to protect the cities of South Wales from the Luftwaffe during The Blitz, and later defended the South Coast of England against Fighter bomber and V-1 flying bomb attacks. It went to North West Europe to defend Antwerp during the final stages of the war, and served in the Gibraltar garrison postwar.

== Royal Engineer origins ==
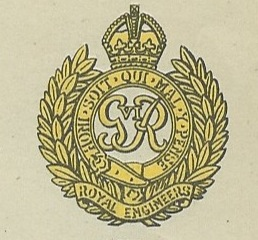
Cap badge of the Royal Engineers (cipher of King George VI)

The Royal Engineers (RE) had developed an extensive anti-aircraft (AA) searchlight (S/L) organisation during World War I, but this was quickly reduced after the Armistice. The last remnants of Nos 3 and 17 AA Companies moved to Blackdown Camp at the end of 1920 to form the nucleus of 1st AA Battalion, RE, as part of the newly created 1st Air Defence Brigade. Although destined to become the largest Regular unit of the RE during the inter-war years, its initial strength was three non-commissioned officers (NCOs) and four sappers under the command of a lieutenant of the Royal Field Artillery. A year later, Lt-Col G.C.E. Elliott became its first RE commanding officer, and after nearly two years, it received substantial reinforcements, including troops experienced in operating lorry-mounted searchlights during the Irish War of Independence. It formed two companies, A and B. From early 1925 the battalion also had a detachment at Belfast, but this disappeared in late 1926.

The main responsibility for AA defence of the United Kingdom was entrusted to the part-time Territorial Army, which developed a large-scale organisation under Anti-Aircraft Command before the outbreak of World War II. The Regulars of 1st Air Defence Brigade (later 1st AA Brigade) were to provide AA cover for field forces, initially for the British Expeditionary Force (BEF) that would go overseas on the outbreak of war. In 1938 it was decided that all coastal and AA searchlights, which operated alongside the Royal Artillery (RA), would become the responsibility of that corps; however, the transfers had not been completed when war was declared in September 1939. A 2nd AA Battalion, RE, was organised at Blackdown in 1936, but this was disbanded in September 1938 and replaced by 2nd Searchlight Regiment, RA.

== World War II ==
RA cap badge.

=== Mobilisation ===
1st AA Battalion, RE, under the command of Lt-Col R.M. Goldney, RA, was ordered to mobilise by 1st AA Brigade on 1 September 1939, and war was declared two days later. Battalion HQ with A and B Companies (which officially became Nos 1 and 2 Companies) left Blackdown and embarked at Southampton on 10 September, landing at Cherbourg Naval Base the following day. However, this may have been a mistake: it is alleged that the movement order was supposed to have said 'less 1st AA Bn RE', and the battalion was intended to defend the Thames Estuary under AA Command.

On arrival in France, the battalion deployed to protect the BEF's No 2 Base Sub-area at Nantes, but at the end of the month it moved up to Fauquembergues, where its lights cooperated with night fighters of No 60 Wing, Royal Air Force in the Aircraft Fighting Zone (AFZ) bounded by Bergues, Cassel and Guisnes (just inland from the ports of Boulogne, Calais and Dunkirk). The 72-light S/L layout (at an average separation of 4500 yards, seven rows deep, with Mk VIII Sound locators in the first row) was built up from west to east as 3rd Searchlight Battery arrived.

3rd Searchlight Battery, RA, had mobilised at Portsmouth, and sailed from Southampton, disembarking on 16 September at Brest, where it was delayed for a week awaiting the arrival of much of its transport. It joined the rest of the battalion on 3 October and deployed three days later. On 17 October the battalion came under the command of 2nd AA Brigade, and on 2 November the first Luftwaffe raider came over the battalion's area (a Heinkel He 111 shot down by the RAF).

4th Searchlight Battery, RA, mobilised on 1 December at Yeovil and sailed from Southampton to Cherbourg on 8 December. It joined the battalion and began deploying round La Capelle-lès-Boulogne on 21 December, filling in the west end of the AFZ. This brought the number of lights operated by the battalion up to 96. From late December, the regiment provided two sections at Boulogne and Dunkirk to cooperate with Light AA (LAA) guns in trying to prevent German seaplanes from dropping Parachute mines in the harbours.

=== Phoney War ===
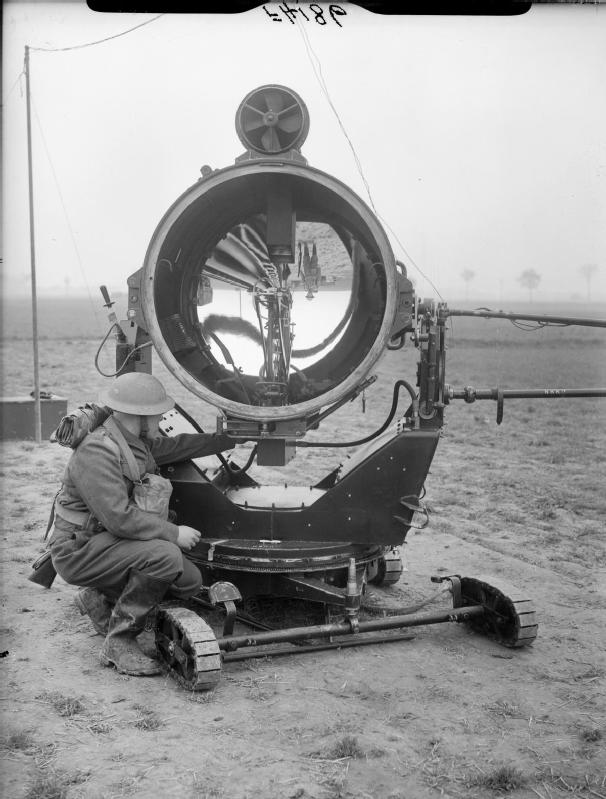
90 cm Searchlight in France May 1940 (this example was operated by 10th S/L Bty, 3rd S/L Rgt)

Apart from occasional air raid alarms, there was little activity during the winter of 1939–40 (the Phoney War). The battalion officially became 1st Searchlight Battalion, RE, on 17 December 1939. and then 1st Searchlight Regiment, RA, on 15 January 1940.

Between 16 and 21 March, A and B S/L Companies, RE, were relieved by 1st and 2nd S/L Batteries, RA, direct from 216th S/L Training Regiment at Kinmel Park, Abergele. The equipment and some of the RE officers and sappers transferred to the new regiment but others returned to the UK, while the RA officers and gunners familiarised themselves with the S/L layout.

From 23 February the regiment formed part of 5th S/L Brigade, which had been formed to control most of the S/L units deployed to protect airfields, ports, and the BEF's forward gun areas. During April, 1st S/Lt Rgt was moved up close to the Belgian Border to protect the artillery concentrating there in accordance with 'Plan D'.

=== Battle of France ===
When the Battle of France began on 10 May, the BEF started its planned advance north into Belgium, but the German Army broke through the Ardennes to the east, forcing the BEF to withdraw again. 1st and 3rd Searchlight Batteries were ordered to hold the bridges on the La Bassée–Béthune Canal 'at all costs' against attacks from the south. They deployed their Boys anti-tank rifles and Bren guns, using S/L lorries as roadblocks, while French forces withdrew through them. The towns were bombed and S/L positions were machine-gunned by Luftwaffe fighters. 4th Searchlight Bty, deployed round Lille, saw constant enemy air activity. On 17 May it detached a group of riflemen with Boys rifles to 5th AA Brigade HQ at Lens (these never returned to the battery during its stay in France) while the remainder joined the Bethune canal guards.

Meanwhile, Army Group A had cut the BEF's lines of communication into France and driven it back towards the coast at Dunkirk, cutting off the British troops at Calais and Boulogne from the main force. When planning the evacuation from Dunkirk (Operation Dynamo), the BEF's commanders decided that Calais and Boulogne should still be held as supply points for further fighting or possible exit points for a final withdrawal. On 17 May, 1st S/L Bty was ordered back to Calais, a move made difficult because all the roads were choked with refugees. There it operated in the S/L role to defend the port.

=== Calais ===
By 20 May, the AA units at Calais, including 1st and 2nd S/L Btys, were deployed in a semi-circle from Fort Risban and Fort Vert west of the town, round to the east side where there was a screen of S/L detachments one mile apart. Lt-Col Goldney was appointed AA Defence Commander for the town. The 1st Bn Queen Victoria's Rifles (QVR), the lead unit of 30th Infantry Brigade, arrived by sea on 22 May, just before advanced German troops began probing the defences.

On the night of 22/23 May the AA units engaged Luftwaffe raiders that bombed Calais, starting fires. But ground attack was now the biggest danger, and the S/L men had to man the perimeter as infantry, a role for which they (mainly older Territorials, raw militiamen and a few ex-RE reservists) were untrained. Goldney ordered his S/L detachments to concentrate at their Troop HQs (THQs) at dawn on 23 May, dig trenches and erect roadblocks. The first serious attack came the following day, against a position held by C Troop of 1st S/L Bty on the Saint-Omer canal at Les Attaques, eight miles south-east of Calais. Reinforced by men from 2nd S/L Bty they put up a stout fight, halting a tank column for three hours before they were overwhelmed.

Next, Goldney's HQ at Orphanage Farm came under attack. The HQ details of 1st S/L Rgt and 172nd LAA Bty (58th (Argyll and Sutherland Highlanders) LAA Rgt), supported by Bren gunners from Lt Airey Neave's Troop of 2nd S/L Bty at nearby Coulogne, held the position for five hours before Goldney ordered them to slip back towards Calais. He ordered Neave to withdraw his men by lorry to Calais, pausing only to destroy his experimental sound locator, codenamed 'Cuckoo'. Neave with a sergeant and a sapper, failed to blow the apparatus up with Gun cotton, but two French drivers abandoned and set on fire their tankers of aviation fuel and the resultant blaze destroyed the equipment successfully.

By 24 May the town was completely cut off, and 2nd Lieutenant William Dothie, commanding a Troop of six S/L detachments east of the town, found himself out of communication with his Battery HQ. His THQ, including a number of stragglers from other units, came under attack by German tanks and aircraft in the evening and he fell back to a small farm in a nearby wood. The following morning, Dothie led an attack on the tanks in their camp, engaging them with Boys and Bren fire. Although the tanks withdrew, Dothie guessed that they would bring up reinforcements and he ordered his men to withdraw, covering their crossing of some open ground with a Bren gun. However, he and the QVR Bren gunner found themselves cut off on the wrong side of the open ground and could not get back to the rendezvous until after dark, by which time the rest of the party had made their way to Calais.

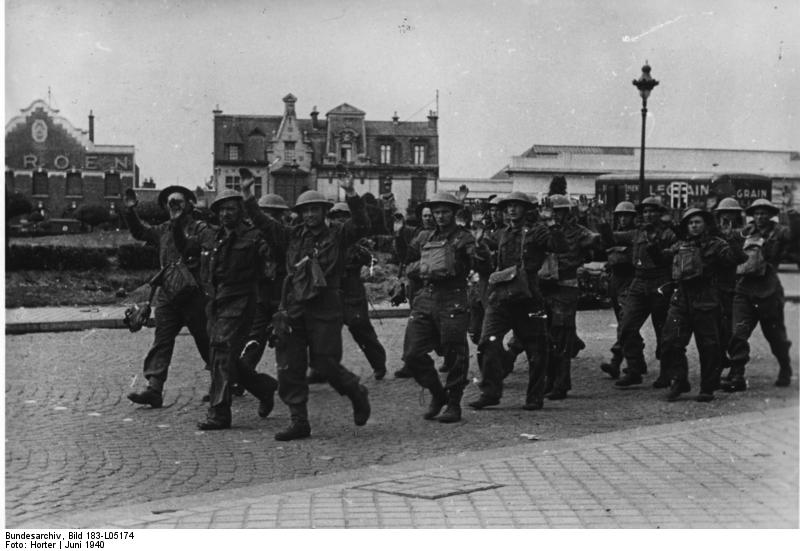
British prisoners being marched away after the fall of Calais, 26 May 1940

In the town, Goldney formed the S/L and AA troops into a reserve for 30th Brigade, which was manning the outer fortifications. On 24 May 30th Brigade's infantry and the S/L gunners were involved in close-quarter fighting and were forced back to the citadel and the harbour. Many wounded and 'non-fighting' personnel were evacuated on the City of Canterbury and the Kohistan and a Flotilla of Destroyers. Goldney allowed about 200 AA troops to leave, but ordered the remainder to stay and fight. Hundreds of 'non-fighting' men, including Neave's party, were left at the port and later in the dunes hoping for evacuation. The garrison held out in the citadel and port until 16.00 on 26 May. The survivors, including Goldney and Neave (by now wounded) became Prisoners of war (PoWs). During the final stages and during the night of 26/27 May some of the defenders escaped or were picked up by boats. Reaching the shore, 2nd Lt Dothie volunteered to swim out to a destroyer to arrange evacuation, but could not reach it and had to return to the beach. Wearing nothing more than a blanket at first, he then went on the run for several days before being taken prisoner. Later, he escaped from a PoW column being marched towards Germany, returned to the coast and stole a boat in which he reached Alderney. Finding that the Channel Islands were already in enemy hands, he returned to Cherbourg Harbour before making a second successful attempt to reach England by boat. He was awarded a Military Cross for his exploits.

Calais fell on 26 May, but its three-day defence, holding up Heinz Guderian's XIX Panzerkorps, had provided some respite for the Dunkirk evacuation.

=== Dunkirk ===
3rd and 4th Searchlight Btys were withdrawn from the La Bassée–Béthune Canal on 19 and 20 May and sent to provide AA cover at Hazebrouck and Cassel, which were heavily bombed. 4th S/L Bty sent some S/L lorries to Lille, but these never rejoined. On 22 May a German mechanised column forced a passage over the Canal de Neufossé at Blaringhem despite the defensive efforts of P Troop, 4th S/L Bty, while N Troop, 4th S/L Bty, was also forced to withdraw. The two troops reached Furnes the following day and dug in along the Furnes–Dunkirk Canal, where they were joined by O Troop and J Troop of 3rd S/L Bty, which had withdrawn from Hazebrouck to Spycker. All the units were being regularly bombed. On 27 May, 4th S/L Bty was ordered to destroy its S/L equipment and vehicles and move into Dunkirk for evacuation, which occurred in the early hours of 28 May. Finally on 28 May 3rd S/L Bty was also ordered to destroy its equipment and march to Dunkirk docks for evacuation. Both batteries were regularly bombed and machine gunned during the evacuation, suffering several casualties.

It is claimed that only one officer and 57 men of 1st Searchlight Regiment's 52 officers and 1600 men got back to England, but that must apply only to the two batteries at Calais, the bulk of the other two batteries having been evacuated from Dunkirk. William Dothie got back on 2 August, and Airey Neave later made the first successful British escape from Colditz Castle, reaching England in April 1942.

=== Blitz ===
On return to the UK, 3rd S/L Bty was quickly re-equipped with a reduced number of S/Ls and sent to Gibraltar in July to bolster the AA defences of the naval base against raids by Vichy French and Italian bombers. 4th Searchlight Bty joined 2nd S/L Rgt defending airfields in South West England and later served in Malta.

1st Searchlight Regiment was reformed at the AA Command Practice Camp at Codsall, near Wolverhampton, on 24 July 1940. The reconstituted unit consisted of 1st, 2nd, 7th and 8th S/L Btys (7th and 8th had served in France with 2nd S/L Rgt), and the replacement personnel were drawn from 477th, 479th and 480th S/L Btys, all of which were newly raised. For example, 477th S/L Bty had been formed at 217th Searchlight Training Regiment at Bradbury Lines, Hereford, with a cadre of experienced men from the Territorial 59th (Warwickshire) S/L Rgt. It was intended to join a newly formed 76 S/L Rgt, but these plans were immediately changed: 477th S/L Bty was disbanded in July and the men posted to 1st S/L Rgt.

At the end of September the regiment joined 45th AA Brigade of 5th AA Division (9th AA Division from November) to complete the 'Illuminated Area' in South Wales. At the time, the towns of South Wales, including important coal and oil port facilities, refineries, steelworks and ordnance factories, were under almost nightly air attack (the Cardiff Blitz and Swansea Blitz). The regiment's searchlights were deployed under both 45th and 61st AA Brigade, assisting the AA guns of the Cardiff and Swansea Gun Defence Areas, while the S/L detachments occasionally engaged the raiders directly with their LMGs.

The regiment supplied a cadre of experienced officers and men to 230th S/L Training Rgt at Blandford Camp where it provided the basis for a new 545 S/L Bty formed on 16 January 1941. This battery later joined a newly forming 81st S/L Rgt.

After The Blitz ended in May 1941, the regiment remained under 61st AA Brigade until January 1942, when it transferred to 27th (Home Counties) AA Brigade in South East England.

=== Hit and run ===
The city of Canterbury was raided in the so-called Baedeker Blitz soon after the regiment arrived in the area, and thereafter the AA defences of Southern England were severely tested by the Luftwaffe's 'hit-and-run' attacks along the South Coast from the summer of 1942. The AA Divisions were disbanded on 30 September and replaced by AA Groups that more closely matched the organisation of RAF Fighter Command. 27th AA Brigade took responsibility for all S/L units under 2 AA Group covering South East England, though 8th S/L Bty was often operationally attached to 71 AA Brigade in 2 AA Group.

Because of the continuing hit-and-run raids by Luftwaffe Fighter-bombers, the defensive armament of S/L positions was enhanced, the allocation of LMGs being increased from one to four and then six per S/L site. Later the LMGs in 27th AA Brigade were supplemented with twin Vickers K machine gun mountings and eventually twin 0.5-inch Browning machine guns on power mountings. The guns had to be manned throughout the hours of daylight.

=== Baby Blitz and Operation Diver ===
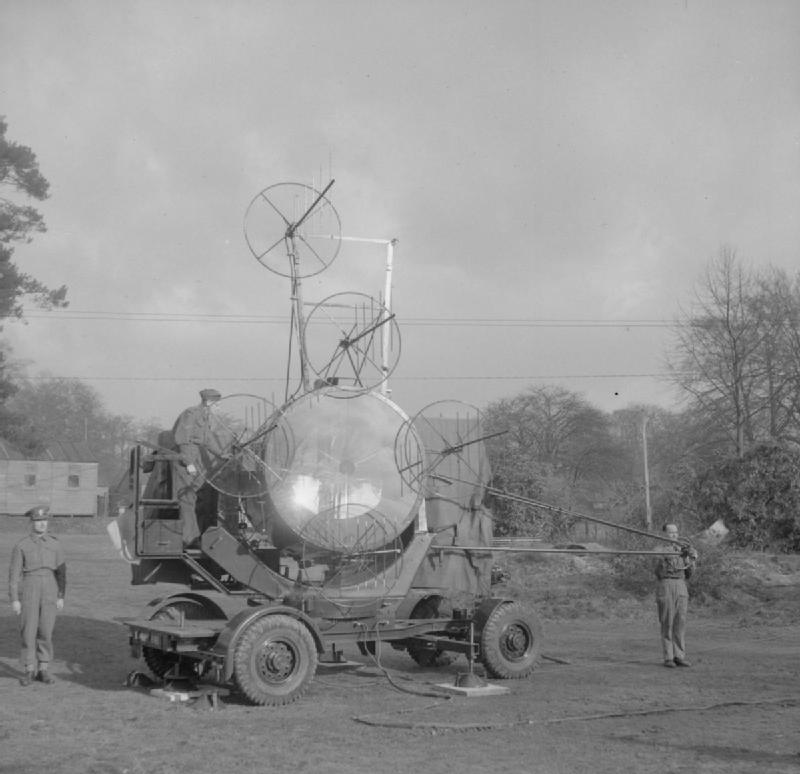
150 cm Searchlight with AA Radar No 2 SLC

Between 21 January and 14 March 1944 the Luftwaffe crossed the S/L belt of SE England to carry out 11 night raids on London in the so-called Baby Blitz. However, by March 1944, AA Command was being forced to release manpower for service overseas, including the planned invasion of Normandy (Operation Overlord). Each of 27th AA Brigade's S/L regiments lost one of its four batteries. In the case of 1st S/L Rgt it was 8th S/L Bty that began to disband on 25 February, completing the process by 24 March. being sent to Malta.

Soon after D Day, the Germans began launching V-1 flying bombs against London by day and night. The AA resources in SE England were strongly reinforced in Operation Diver, the S/L belt being thickened up both to cooperate with RAF Night fighters and to use their S/L Control (SLC or 'Elsie') radar to guide LAA guns. All these units were heavily engaged until the autumn, when 21st Army Group overran the V-1 launching sites in northern France.

=== North West Europe ===
By the end of 1944, 21st Army Group had advanced to the Belgium–Netherlands frontier, and required AA reinforcements to protect the vital port of Antwerp and its approaches up the Scheldt Estuary from bombing (including parachute mines) and 'Divers'. 1st Searchlight Regiment left 27th AA Brigade and crossed to the Continent in January 1945 under the command of Lt-Col G.Howson to join 76th AA Brigade.

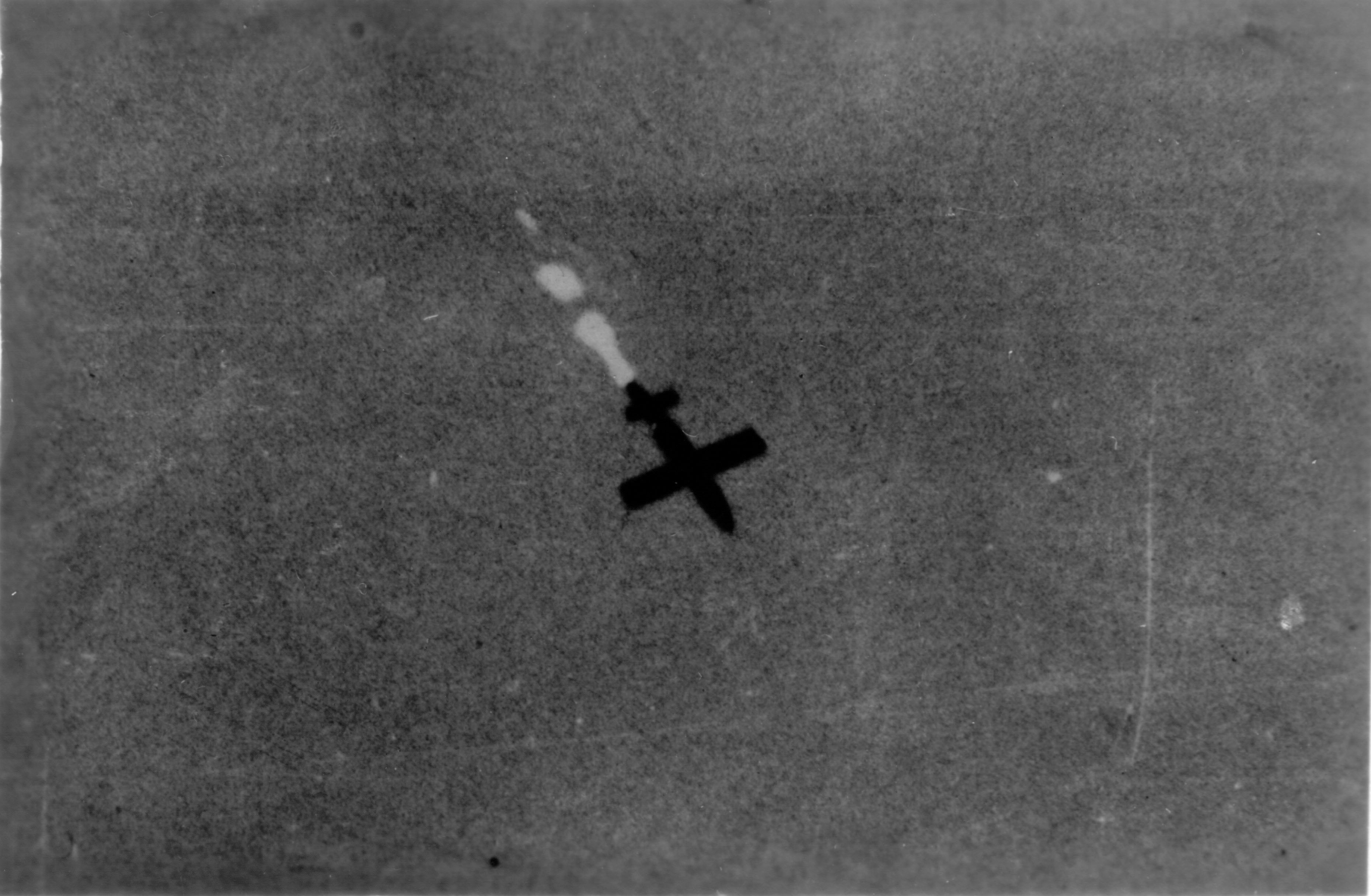
V-1 in flight over Antwerp

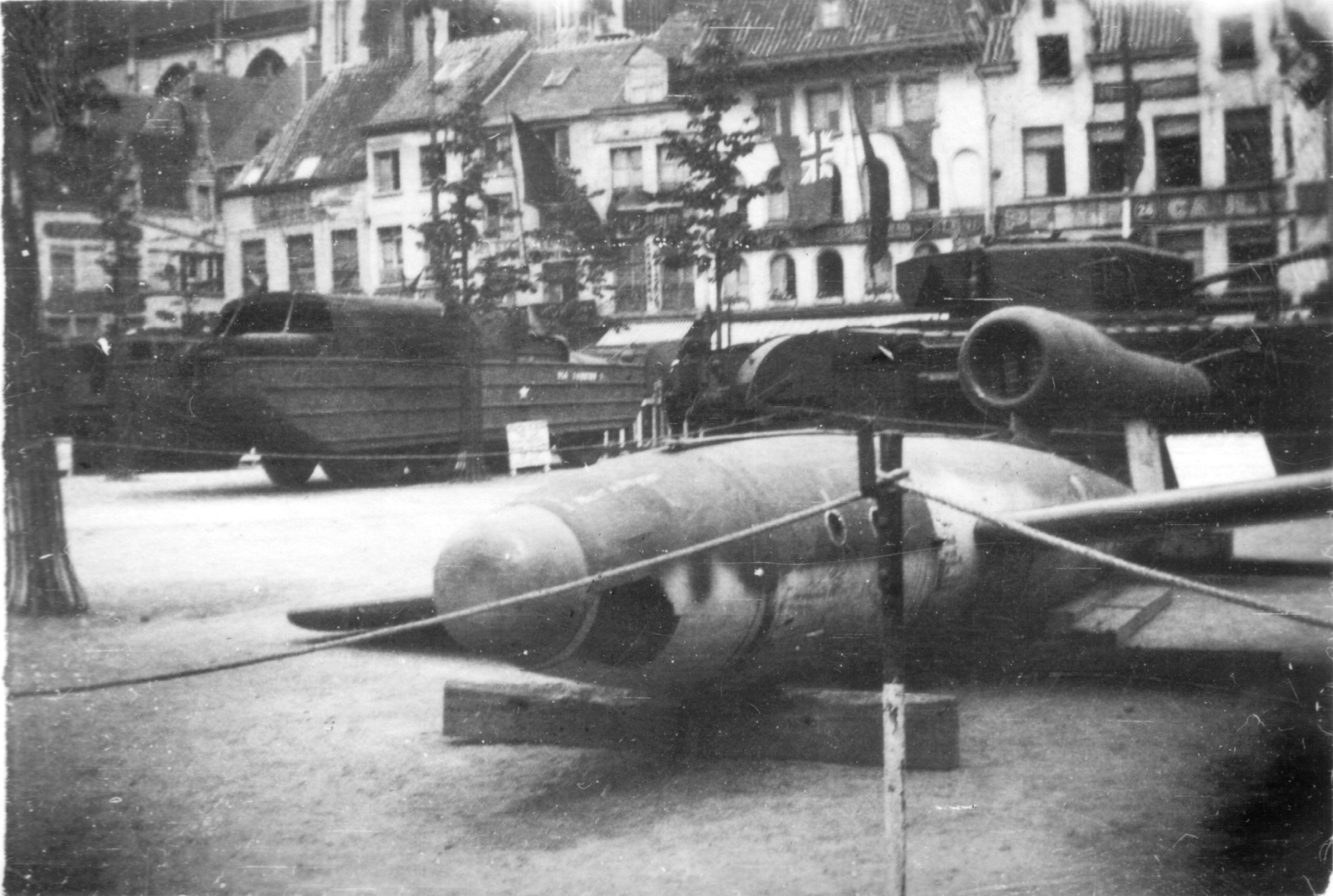
Captured V-1 displayed at Antwerp at the end of World War II.

The regiment relieved 2nd S/L Rgt on the Scheldt on 23 January, with Regimental HQ at Goes on South Beveland, 1st S/L Bty HQ at 's-Heerenhoek and 2nd S/L Bty HQ at Krabbendijke. These two batteries took over a permanent radar watch to provide early warning for the LAA units deployed with them. The regiment also supplied the S/Ls for two Landing Craft Flak operating in the estuary under 124th (Highland) LAA Rgt. The AA units on the Scheldt were employed both in the AA and coastal defence role, because of German miniature submarines infiltrating into the shipping lane. 7th Searchlight Battery was detached and deployed at Brasschaat near Antwerp on anti-Diver duties under 5th Royal Marine AA Brigade. On 25 February a V-1 hit inflicted casualties of five killed, two missing and six wounded on this battery.

During February the regiment began to receive the latest AA No 2 Mk VIII* SLC centimetric radar to improve the coverage of the AA Inner Artillery Zone. However, the threat of serious air raids diminished as the war drew to its close, and the Diver defences were closed down on 20 April. While some other AA units were disbanded or moved up into Germany, 1st S/L Rgt maintained its deployment throughout the final weeks of the war.

76th AA Brigade was ordered to cease fire on 3 May 1945 when a local truce came into effect to allow supplies to be airlifted to civilians in the enemy-occupied Netherlands (Operation Manna). This was followed on 4 May by the German surrender at Lüneburg Heath and the end of the war in Europe (VE Day).

After VE Day, 76th AA Brigade remained temporarily on its AA tasks. Its units, including the whole of 1st S/L Rgt, then returned to the mainland from the Scheldt islands and concentrated north of Antwerp before moving into Germany in June to garrison the Dortmund–Bochum area. 1st Searchlight Regiment returned to the UK on 1 December 1945.

== Postwar ==
On 1 April 1947 the regiment was redesignated 78th Searchlight Regiment, RA (not to be confused with the wartime 78th S/L Rgt, disbanded in 1943), 1, 2 and 7 S/L Btys becoming 212, 213 and 240 S/L Btys respectively. However, on 30 September 1948 the regiment was re-equipped with 3.7-inch AA guns as 78th Heavy Anti-Aircraft Regiment, RA (not to be confused with the wartime 78th (1st East Anglian) HAA Rgt, which had been reformed as 284th HAA Rgt in the TA). In August 1950 the regiment went to Gibraltar, where 213 and 240 Btys served in the Grand Casemates and 212 Bty at Moorish Castle. On Gibraltar the regiment was equipped with a mixture of 3.7-inch HAA guns and 6-pounder and 17-pounder anti-tank guns. On 4 December 1953 the regiment was ordered back to Woolwich for disbandment, which was completed on 1 February 1954.

== External sources ==
- Keith Brigstock 'Royal Artillery Searchlights', presentation to Royal Artillery Historical Society at Larkhill, 17 January 2007.
- British Army units from 1945 on
- British Military History
- Jon Latimer, 'Sacrifice at Calais' at HistoryNet.
- WWII Escape and Evasion Information Exchange
- Royal Artillery 1939–1945
