= 11th Anti-Aircraft Division =

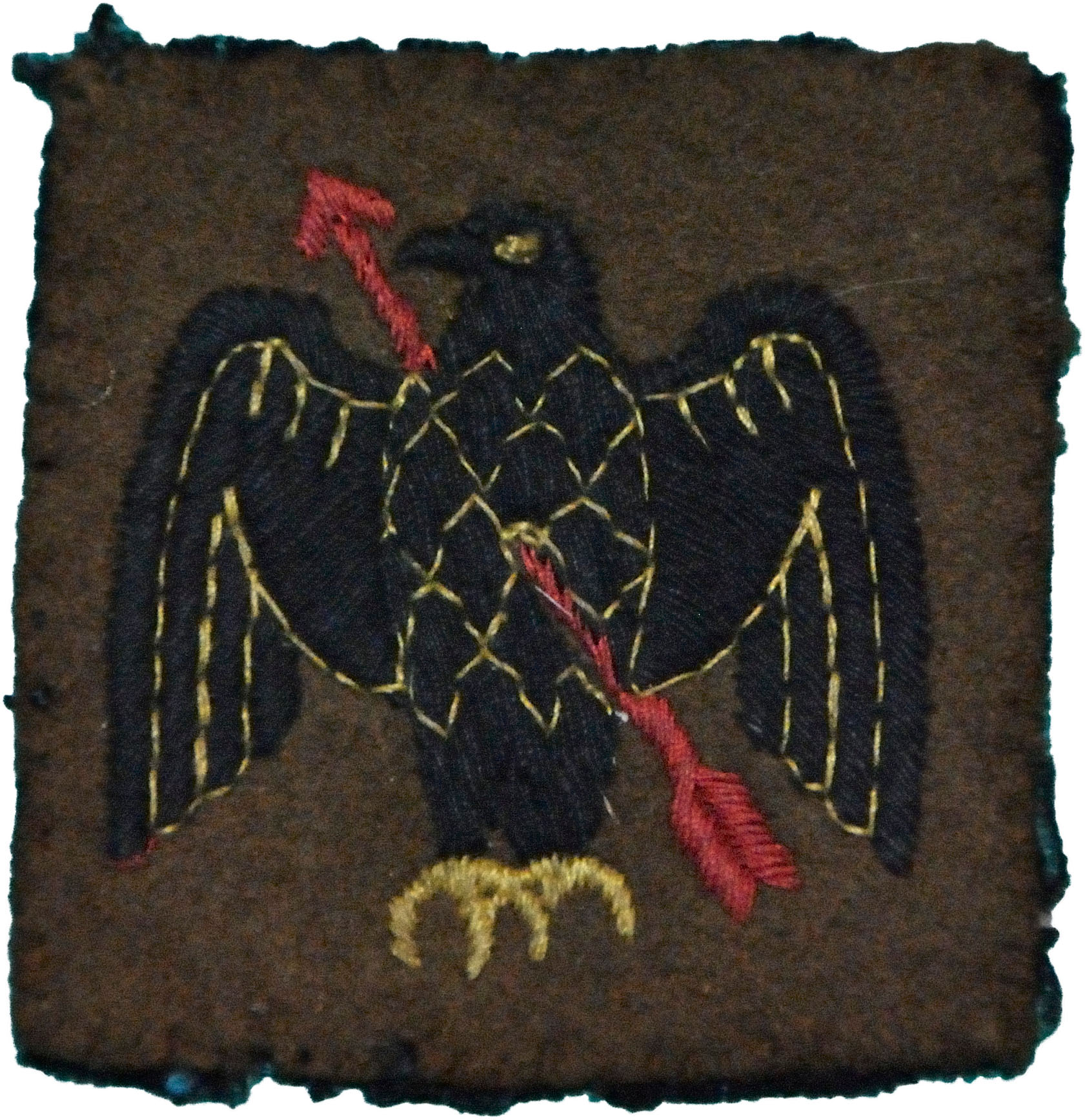
- Formation sign of the division.
- Active: 11 November 1940 – 30 September 1942
- Country: United Kingdom
- Branch: British Army
- Type: Anti-Aircraft Division
- Role: Air Defence
- Size: 3–4 Brigades
- Part of: 2 AA Corps
- Garrison/HQ: Birmingham
- Engagements: Coventry Blitz; Birmingham Blitz; Baedeker Blitz

Commanders
- Notable commanders: Sidney Archibald

The 11th Anti-Aircraft Division (11th AA Division) was an air defence formation of the British Army during the early years of the Second World War. It defended the West Midlands during The Blitz, including the notorious raid on Coventry, and the subsequent Baedeker Blitz, but only had a short career.

== Mobilisation ==
The 11th Anti-Aircraft Division was one of five new divisions created on 1 November 1940 by Anti-Aircraft Command to control the expanding anti-aircraft (AA) defences of the United Kingdom. The division was formed by separating two Territorial Army (TA) brigade areas (34th (South Midland) and 54th) from the 4th AA Division in North West England and adding a Regular Army headquarters from the (1st AA Brigade) that had recently returned from the Dunkirk evacuation.

The divisional headquarters (HQ) was at Birmingham and the first General Officer Commanding (GOC), appointed on 14 November 1940, was Major-General Sidney Archibald, who had been Major General, Royal Artillery, of Home Forces and was a former commander of the 34th (South Midland) AA Brigade. The 11th AA Division formed part of II AA Corps.

== The Blitz ==
The division's fighting units, organised into three AA Brigades, consisted of Heavy (HAA) and Light (LAA) gun regiments and Searchlight (S/L) regiments of the Royal Artillery. The HAA guns were concentrated in the Gun Defence Areas (GDAs) at Birmingham and Coventry, LAA units were distributed to defend Vulnerable Points (VPs) such as factories and airfields, while the S/L detachments were disposed in clusters of three, spaced 10,400 yards (9,500 m) apart.

=== Coventry Blitz ===
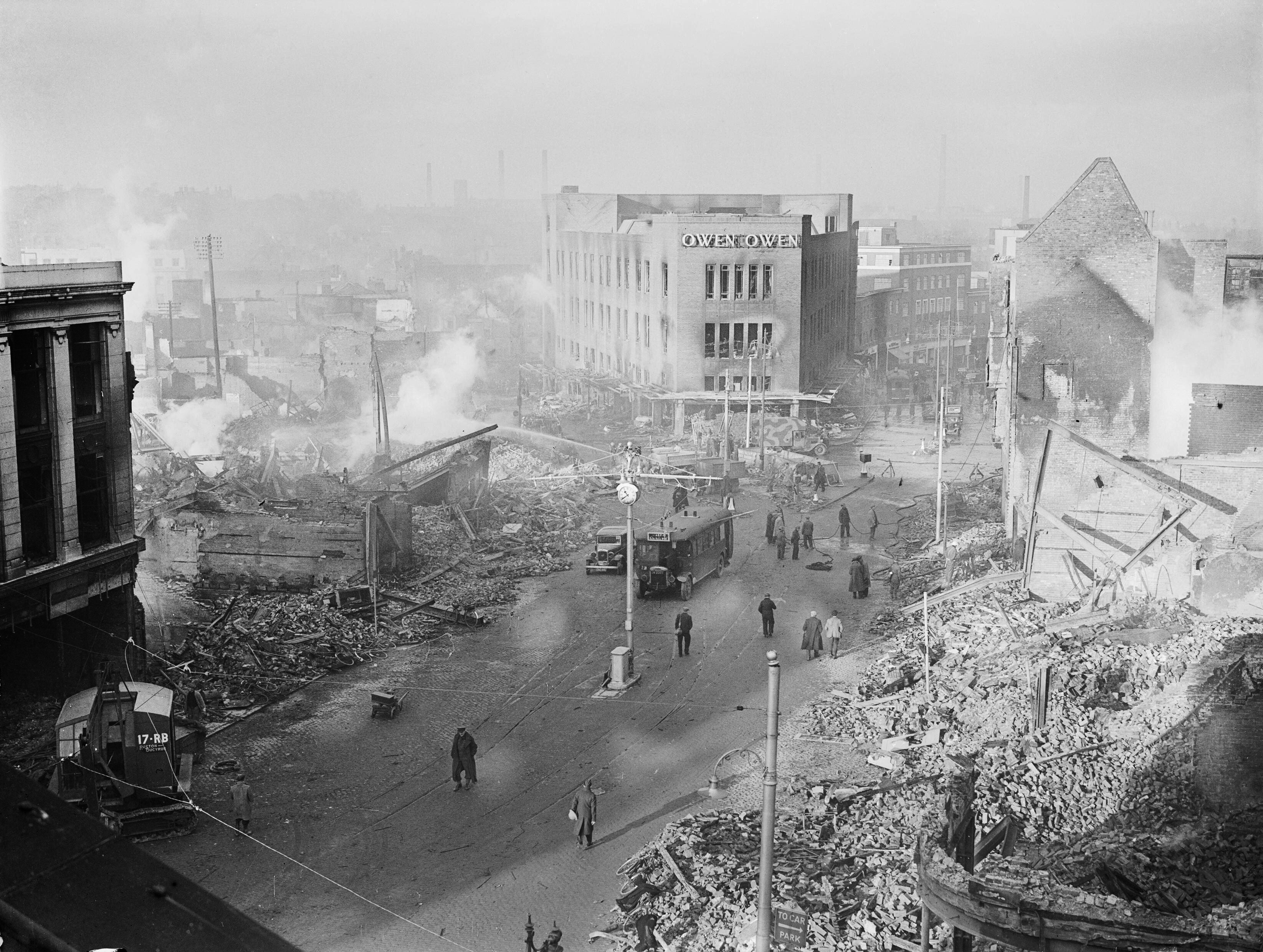
Coventry city centre following the 14/15 November air raid

At the time the 11th AA Division was created, the industrial towns of the UK were under regular attack by night, to which the limited AA defences replied as best they could. The West Midlands had already suffered badly, with Birmingham and Coventry receiving heavy raids in August and October. The new division was still being formed when the Luftwaffe launched a series of devastating raids, beginning with the notorious Coventry Blitz on 14/15 November.

The Coventry raid was preceded by a dozen pathfinder aircraft of Kampfgeschwader 100 riding an X-Gerät beam to drop flares and incendiary bombs on the target. The huge fires that broke out in the congested city centre then attracted successive 40-strong waves of bombers flying at heights between 12,000 and 20,000 feet to saturate the defences. The AA Defence Commander (AADC) of 95th (Birmingham) HAA Rgt had prepared a series of concentrations to be fired using sound-locators and GL Mk. I gun-laying radar, and 128 concentrations were fired before the bombing severed all lines of communication and the noise drowned out sound-location. Some gun positions were able to fire at S/L beam intersections, glimpsed through the smoke and guessing the range. Although the Coventry guns fired 10 rounds a minute for the whole 10-hour raid, only three aircraft were shot down over the UK that night, and the city centre was gutted.

The change in enemy tactics led to HAA guns being moved from London to the West Midlands (for example, the 6th HAA Regt).

=== Birmingham Blitz ===
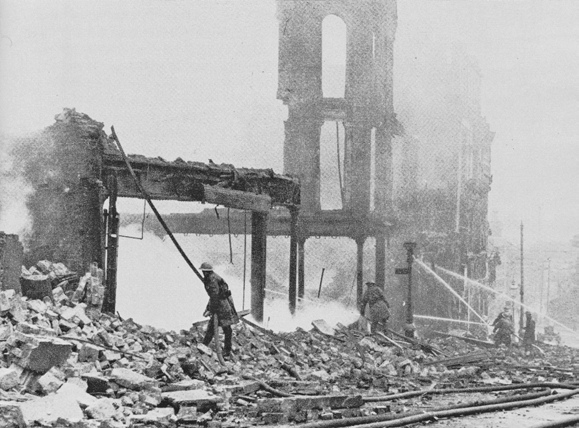
Birmingham High Street, looking towards the Bull Ring area, after heavy bombing on 10 April 1941.

The Coventry raid was followed by three consecutive nights (19–22 November) of attacks on Birmingham and other Black Country industrial towns including West Bromwich, Dudley and Tipton were all hit. Birmingham was bombed again during December (3, 4, 11) and on 11 March 1941, but the full Birmingham Blitz came in April 1941, with heavy raids on the nights of 9/10 and 10/11 of the month, causing extensive damage and casualties.

The Blitz is generally held to have ended on 16 May 1941 with another attack on Birmingham. By now the HAA sites had the advantage of GL Mk I* radar with an elevation finding (E/F or 'Effie') attachment, and several attackers were turned away by accurate fire and their bombs scattered widely, some on nearby Nuneaton. The city was attacked again in July, but the Luftwaffe bombing offensive was effectively over. The West Midlands had been the hardest hit area of the UK after London and Merseyside.

=== Order of Battle 1940–41 ===
The division's composition during the Blitz was as follows:

- 1st AA Brigade – HQ Crewe: responsible for Staffordshire, airfields and VPs; left by May 1941
  - 1st HAA Rgt
  - 106th HAA Rgt
  - 45th LAA Rgt
  - 63rd LAA Rgt – new regiment raised in October 1940
  - 61st (South Lancashire) S/L Rgt
  - 78th S/L Rgt
  - 83rd S/L Rgt – new regiment raised in January 1941 at Crewe
- 34th (South Midland) AA Brigade – HQ Coventry: responsible for Birmingham and Coventry GDAs
  - 6 HAA Regt – arrived from London 24 November 1940
  - 60th (City of London) HAA Rgt
  - 95th (Birmingham) HAA Rgt
  - 110th HAA Rgt – new regiment raised in October 1940
  - 112th HAA Rgt – new regiment raised in October 1940
  - 22nd LAA Regt
- 54th AA Brigade – HQ Sutton Coldfield: responsible for S/L provision to West Midlands GDAs
  - 45th (Royal Warwickshire Regiment) S/L Rgt
  - 80th S/L Rgt – new regiment raised in October 1940
- 10th AA 'Z' Rgt – divisional Z Battery rocket unit formed January 1941
- 11th AA Divisional Signals, Royal Corps of Signals (RCS) – formed at Birmingham November–December 1940 as duplicate of 4 AA Divisional Signals
- 11th AA Divisional Royal Army Service Corps (RASC)
  - 254th and 912th Companies
- 11th AA Divisional Company, Royal Army Medical Corps (RAMC)
- 11th AA Divisional Workshop Company, Royal Army Ordnance Corps (RAOC)

By March 1941, the 1st AA Brigade HQ together with the Regular 1st and 6th HAA Rgts had returned to the War Office (WO) Reserve pending deployment overseas, but temporarily remained part of AA Command. By mid-May 1941, the 1st AA Brigade had handed over its units and responsibilities to a new 68th AA Brigade and left AA Command, while the 67th AA Brigade had also been created by splitting the 34th AA Brigade.

== Mid-War ==
By October 1941, the availability of S/L control radar was sufficient to allow AA Command's S/L sites to be 'declustered' into single-light sites spaced at 10,400 yards (9,500 m) intervals in 'Indicator Belts' in the approaches to the GDAs, and 'Killer Belts' at 6,000 yards (5,500 m) spacing to cooperate with the RAF's Night-fighters.

Although the Luftwaffe's so-called Baedeker Blitz of 1942 was mainly aimed at unprotected cities, Birmingham was hit on several occasions in June and July that year.

Newly formed AA units joined the division, the HAA and support units increasingly becoming 'Mixed' units, indicating that women of the Auxiliary Territorial Service (ATS) were fully integrated into them. At the same time, experienced units were posted away to train for service overseas. This led to a continual turnover of units, which accelerated in 1942 with the preparations for the invasion of North Africa (Operation Torch) and the need to transfer AA units to counter the Baedeker raids and the Luftwaffe's hit-and-run attacks against South Coast towns.

=== Order of Battle 1941–42 ===
During this period, the division was composed as follows:

- 34th AA Brigade
  - 6th HAA Rgt – left in September 1941 for overseas service; captured in Java March 1942
  - 55th (Kent) HAA Rgt – from 6th AA Division by December 1941; to WO Control December 1941, left February 1942 for Persia and Iraq Command (PAIFORCE)
  - 57th (Wessex) HAA Rgt – from 1st AA Division March 1942; to 9th AA Division May 1942
  - 60th HAA Rgt – to the 68th AA Brigade Summer 1941
  - 65th (Manchester Regiment) HAA Rgt – from Orkney and Shetland Defences (OSDEF) June 1941; to 3rd AA Division Autumn 1941
  - 71st (Forth) HAA Rgt – from 3rd AA Division by December 1941; to 6th AA Division May 1942
  - 95th HAA Rgt – returned from 67th AA Brigade December 1941; left January 1942, arrived in India April 1942
  - 107th HAA Rgt – from 4th AA Division by May 1942; to 5th AA Division June 1942
  - 110th HAA Rgt – to OSDEF May 1941
  - 122nd HAA Rgt – new regiment formed in February 1941; to 67th AA Brigade by December 1941
  - 134th (Mixed) HAA Rgt – new regiment formed in September 1941
  - 142nd (Mixed) HAA Rgt – from 67th AA Brigade June 1942
  - 22nd LAA Rgt – returned from 67th AA Brigade by December 1941; to 54th AA Brigade June 1942
  - 42nd LAA Rgt – left Summer 1941; to Middle East Forces by December 1941
  - 10th AA 'Z' Rgt – to 67th AA Brigade Summer 1941; returned by December 1941
- 54th AA Brigade
  - 22nd LAA Rgt – from 34th AA Brigade June 1942; to WO Control September 1942; later to Operation Torch
  - 111th LAA Rgt – from 2nd AA Division July 1942
  - 128th LAA Rgt – from 67 AA Brigade June 1942; to 68 AA Brigade July 1942
  - 30th (Surrey) S/L Rgt – from 10th AA Division by May 1942; to WO Control September 1942; later to Operation Torch
  - 45th S/L Rgt – converted into 122nd LAA Rgt February 1942, joined 68th AA Brigade May 1942
  - 59th S/L Rgt – to OSDEF May 1941
  - 80th S/L Rgt
  - 83rd S/L Rgt – from 68th AA Brigade Summer 1941
- 67th AA Brigade
  - 95th HAA Rgt – from 34th AA Brigade by May 1941, returned December 1941
  - 122nd HAA Rgt – from 34th AA Brigade by December 1941; to 68th AA Brigade December 1941
  - 138th HAA Rgt – from 9th AA Division August 1942; to 3rd AA Division September 1942
  - 142nd (Mixed) HAA Rgt – new unit formed December 1941; to 34th AA Brigade June 1942
  - 22nd LAA Rgt – from 34th AA Brigade by May 1941; returned by December 1941
  - 79th LAA Rgt – new unit formed July 1941; to PAIFORCE by May 1942
  - 10th AA 'Z' Rgt – from 34th AA Brigade Summer 1941; returned by December 1941

By May 1942, the 67th AA Brigade consisted only of 142nd (M) HAA Rgt; thereafter it was joined by:

  - 119th HAA Rgt – from 8th AA Division June 1942; to OSDEF September 1942
  - 143rd (Mixed) HAA Rgt – new regiment formed January 1942, joined July 1942
  - 87th LAA Rgt – from 8th AA Division June 1942; to unbrigaded July 1942
  - 128th LAA Rgt – converted from 87th S/L Rgt, joined May 1942; to 54th AA Brigade June 1942
  - 135th LAA Rgt – new regiment formed in January 1942; joined July 1942; to 8th AA Division September 1942
  - 37th (Tyne Electrical Engineers) S/L Rgt – from 9th AA Division July 1942; returned September 1942

In June 1942, the 67th AA Brigade transferred to the 9th AA Division, and by October 1942 it once again consisted of a single regiment (143rd (M) HAA).

- 68th AA Brigade
  - 60th HAA Rgt – from 34th AA Brigade Summer 1941; to 12th AA Division by December 1941
  - 106th HAA Rgt – from 1st AA Brigade; to 2nd AA Division Summer 1941
  - 115th HAA Rgt – from OSDEF September 1942
  - 122nd HAA Rgt – from 67th AA Brigade December 1941; to unbrigaded July 1942
  - 45th LAA Rgt – from 1st AA Brigade; to 2nd AA Division December 1941
  - 63rd LAA Rgt – from 1st AA Brigade; to WO Control September 1942; later to Operation Torch
  - 98th LAA Rgt – new unit formed by a cadre from 45th LAA Rgt December 1941; to 4th AA Division by May 1942
  - 122nd LAA Rgt – from 87th S/L Rgt, 54th AA Brigade, May 1942; to 6th AA Division by September 1942
  - 128th LAA Rgt – from 54th AA Brigade July 1942
  - 38th (The King's Regiment) S/L Rgt – from OSDEF June 1941
  - 61st S/L Rgt – from 1st AA Brigade
  - 83rd S/L Rgt – from 1st AA Brigade; to 54th AA Brigade Summer 1941
  - 78th S/L Rgt – from 1st AA Brigade

The increased sophistication of Operations Rooms and communications was reflected in the growth in support units, which attained the following organisation by May 1942:

- 11th AA Division Mixed Signal Unit HQ, RCS
  - HQ No 1 Company
    - 11th AA Division Mixed Signal Office Section
    - 68th AA Brigade Signal Office Mixed Sub-Section
    - 118th RAF Fighter Sector Sub-Section (RAF Atcham)
    - 320th AA Gun Operations Room Mixed Signal Section (Crewe)
    - 344th AA Gun Operations Room Mixed Signal Section (RAF Valley)
    - 20th AA Line Maintenance Section
  - HQ No 2 Company
    - 40st AA Gun Operations Room Mixed Signal Section (Birmingham)
      - st1 AA Sub-Gun Operations Room Mixed Signal Sub-Section
      - 2nd AA Sub-Gun Operations Room Mixed Signal Sub-Section
      - 3rd AA Sub-Gun Operations Room Mixed Signal Sub-Section
      - 4th AA Sub-Gun Operations Room Mixed Signal Sub-Section
    - 413th AA Gun Operations Room Mixed Signal Section (Coventry) – formed from 4 Sub-GOR July 1942
    - 34th AA Brigade Signal Office Mixed Sub-Section
    - 54th AA Brigade Signal Office Mixed Sub-Section
    - 119th RAF Fighter Sector Sub-Section (RAF Honiley)
    - 28th AA Line Maintenance Section
    - 29th AA Line Maintenance Section
- HQ 11th AA Div RASC
  - 254th, 912th Companies
- 11th AA Div RAMC
- 11th AA Div Workshop Company, RAOC
- 11th AA Div Radio Maintenance Company, RAOC

The RAOC companies became part of the new Royal Electrical and Mechanical Engineers (REME) during 1942.

== Disbandment ==
A reorganisation of AA Command in October 1942 saw the AA divisions disbanded and replaced by a smaller number of AA Groups more closely aligned with the groups of RAF Fighter Command. The 11th AA Division merged with the 4th AA Division into the 4th AA Group based at Preston and cooperating with No. 9 Group RAF.

The 11th AA Divisional Signals was amalgamated back into its parent 4th AA Divisional Signals as the 4th AA Group (Mixed) Signals.

== General Officer Commanding ==
The following officer commanded 11th AA Division:

- Major-General Sidney Archibald (11 November 1940 – 30 September 1942)

== External sources ==
- Anti-Aircraft Command (1940) at British Military History
- Generals of World War II
- Royal Artillery 1939–1945
