= Sidney Archibald =

British Army general (1890–1973)

Major-General Sidney Archibald MC
- Born: 30 October 1890
- Died: 1 January 1973 (aged 82); Dorchester, Dorset, England
- Military career
- Allegiance: United Kingdom
- Branch: British Army
- Service years: 1910–1944
- Rank: Major-General
- Service number: 737
- Unit: Royal Artillery
- Commands: 11th Anti-Aircraft Division (1940–43); 34th Anti-Aircraft Group (1938–39)
- Conflicts: First World War; Second World War
- Awards: Military Cross

Major-General Sidney Charles Manley Archibald, MC (30 October 1890 – 1 January 1973) was a British Army officer who served in both the First and Second World Wars.

== Military career ==
Born in 1890, Archibald, after attending and later graduating from the Royal Military College, Sandhurst, was commissioned into the Royal Artillery on 23 December 1910. He served in France throughout the First World War, where he was awarded the Military Cross.

Like many others of his generation, Archibald remained in the army during the interwar period and, after being married in 1925, attended the Staff College, Camberley from 1926 to 1927, where Harold Alexander, Douglas Wimberley, Charles Hudson and Brian Robertson were among his classmates. Upon being seconded for service on the staff in January 1929, he then served on the staff of Northern Command, India, from 1929–1930, and later attended the Imperial Defence College in 1933. After that, from 1934, he served as a Staff officer in the War Office, until 1937. He was promoted to colonel on 1 November 1937, with seniority backdated to 1 July 1935. The next year saw him being made an Assistant Quartermaster-Master General with Anti-Aircraft Command, later going on to command the 34th Anti-Aircraft Group the year after that.

Archibald was promoted to major-general in June 1940, the year after the outbreak of the Second World War, where he served with Home Forces as General Officer Commanding (GOC) of the 11th Anti-Aircraft Division from 1941 to 1943. That year saw him as Advisor to Canada on Anti-Aircraft Defences until 1944 saw him retire from the army after well over thirty years of service.

Archibald, in his retirement, was Colonel Commandant of the Royal Artillery from 1952 to 1958. He died in Dorchester, Dorset on 1 January 1973, at the age of 82.

== Bibliography ==
- Smart, Nick (2005). Biographical Dictionary of British Generals of the Second World War. Barnesley: Pen & Sword. ISBN 1844150496.
