= 45th Light Anti-Aircraft Regiment, Royal Artillery =

45th Light Anti-Aircraft Regiment, RA
- Royal Artillery cap badge
- Active: 10 July 1940 – 1 December 1945
- Country: United Kingdom
- Branch: British Army
- Role: Air Defence; Garrison; Line of Communication
- Size: Regiment
- Part of: Royal Artillery
- Engagements: The Blitz; Tunisian Campaign; Italian Campaign

45th Light Anti-Aircraft Regiment, Royal Artillery (45th LAA Rgt), was a British Territorial Army (TA) unit formed in July 1940. After serving in Anti-Aircraft Command during the Battle of Britain and The Blitz, it went to North Africa as part of Operation Torch and fought in Tunisia and Italy. It ended World War II as a garrison regiment.

== Origin ==
The regiment was formed on 10 July 1940 as part of the rapid expansion of Britain's Anti-Aircraft (AA) defences during the Battle of Britain. It was originally constituted with 500 to 507 LAA Troops, which had been formed on 1 July. It was then joined by 102 and 135 LAA Batteries, which had been formed on mobilisation of the TA (23–25 August 1939) and by 142 LAA Bty transferred from 22nd LAA Rgt, a TA unit based in Birmingham. It formed part of 1st AA Bde, which had been reformed after the Dunkirk evacuation and had been assigned by Anti-Aircraft Command to defend the industrial town of Crewe in the West Midlands under 4th AA Division. Light AA guns were usually deployed to defend Vulnerable Points (VPs) such as factories, rail junctions, airfields etc, but AA Command was suffering a severe shortage of suitable LAA guns: with too few of the preferred Bofors 40 mm guns available, the newly-formed regiments were largely equipped with Light machine guns (AALMGs) until 1942.

== Home Defence ==
As AA Command expanded, 4th AA Division was split, and 1st AA Bde at Crewe was assigned to a new 11th AA Division. The West Midlands was badly hit during the Blitz of November 1940 to May 1941. By the end of the Blitz 45th LAA Rgt with its three batteries had transferred to the command of a new 68th AA Bde in 11th AA Division.

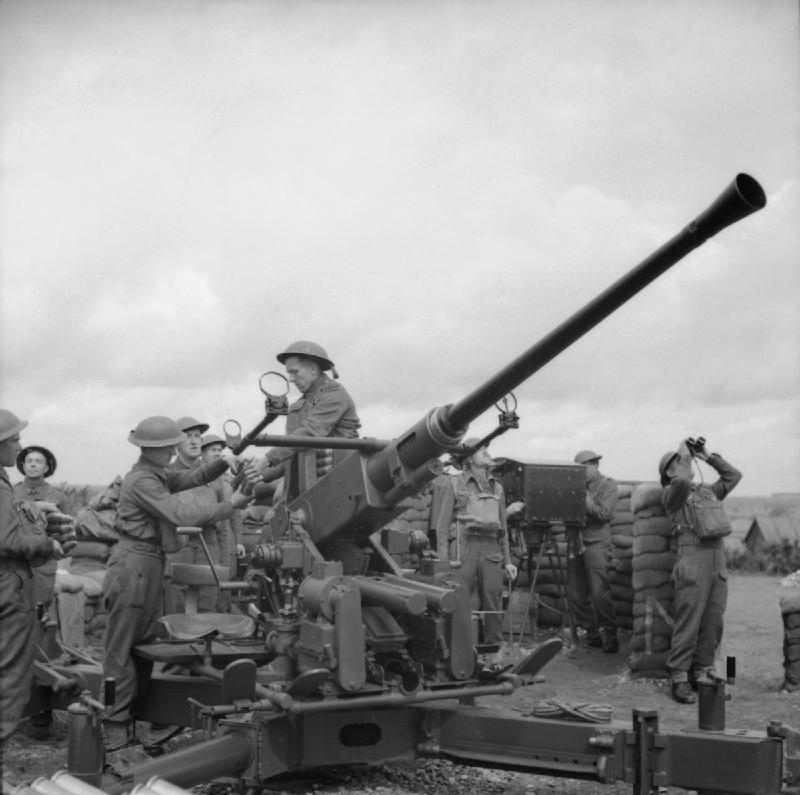
Bofiors gun and crew in England, May 1941.

The regiment sent a cadre of experienced officers and men to 224th LAA Training Rgt at Aberystwyth where they provided the basis for a new 265 LAA Bty formed on 12 June 1941. When this battery was regimented with 45th LAA Rgt on 4 September 102 LAA Bty transferred to a new 82nd LAA Rgt forming in Norfolk. Later that month, while the regiment was at Meriden, it was also joined by 306 LAA Bty, which had been formed from the fourth Troops of 70, 72 and 141 LAA Btys of 22nd LAA Rgt. Then on 20 November the fourth Troops of 135, 142 and 265 LAA Btys were detached from 45th LAA Rgt to form a new 326 LAA Bty at Shifnal, which was regimented with 76th LAA Rgt. By December 306 LAA Bty had also left to help form a new 98th LAA Rgt at Albrighton, which replaced 45th LAA Rgt in 68 AA Bde.

After 45th LAA Rgt left 68 AA Bde it transferred to 66 AA Bde in 2nd AA Division. This division was responsible for the defence of the East Midlands. During the spring, 142 LAA Bty was attached to 41 (London) AA Bde and 265 LAA Bty to 10th AA Division.

At this stage of the war, experienced AA units were being trained for service overseas. By April 1942 45th LAA Rgt had come under War Office Control while remaining deployed with AA Command. 66 AA Brigade HQ left AA Command in August 1942 to join First Army preparing for the invasion of North Africa (Operation Torch), and 45th LAA Rgt came under 32 (Midland) AA Bde, though it was also part of the War Office Reserve.

In the autumn of 1942 45th LAA Rgt also left AA Command and came fully under War Office control, with the following organisation for mobile operations:

- 135, 142, 265 LAA Btys
- 45 LAA Rgt Signal Section, Royal Corps of Signals
- 45 LAA Workshop, Royal Electrical and Mechanical Engineers
- 45 LAA Rgt Platoon, Royal Army Service Corps

== North Africa ==
In 1942, equipped with Bofors guns, 45th LAA Rgt was attached to Allied Force Headquarters for Operation Torch, the invasion of North Africa. The troop convoys assembled in the River Clyde in October 1942 and sailed to North Africa, where the British troops began landing at Algiers on 8 November. The force then moved eastwards to seize the port of Bougies and Djidjelli airfield, 45th LAA Rgt following them by sea. It had been intended to land two LAA troops on the beaches near Djidjelli, but sea conditions prevented this and the whole regiment disembarked at Bougies.

Axis air command reacted quickly to the Allied invasion. As the AA troops moved into their positions they were dive-bombed in the open, particularly at Djidjelli. Here a battery of 45th LAA Rgt and a troop from 58th HAA Rgt rapidly organised barrages in close defence, so effectively that three enemy aircraft were destroyed and the gun positions survived. There was a repeated attack, by Ju 87s and Ju 88s flying at 5000–6000 feet, on 22 November, which lasted two hours.

In January 1943, as the Tunisian Campaign developed, 45th LAA Rgt was assigned to British First Army. While V Corps advanced towards Tunis through rough country and steep-sided valleys. 45th LAA Regiment accompanied it to provide AA cover. A large number of small actions were fought by isolated AA troops against fast, low-flying attacks. In these 'snap' engagements the No 3 LAA Predictor was useless and deflection fire had to be judged using the visual Correctional Sight, known as the 'Stiffkey Stick'. Off-road deployment was so limited by soft ground that the regiment issued an order that no Bofors gun should be positioned further from hard going by more than the length of its tractor's tow rope.

By Mid-March 1943, 45th LAA Rgt was assigned to provide LAA cover for French XIX Corps, which had joined the Allied force. In the final phase of the campaign (Operation Vulcan), 45th LAA Rgt formed part of 52nd AA Bde, which held a number of AA units on their wheels and ready to move into the objectives of Tunis and Bizerta immediately behind the leading battle groups. They deployed in Tunis on 7 May before the last German combat groups had been cleared out.

== Italy ==
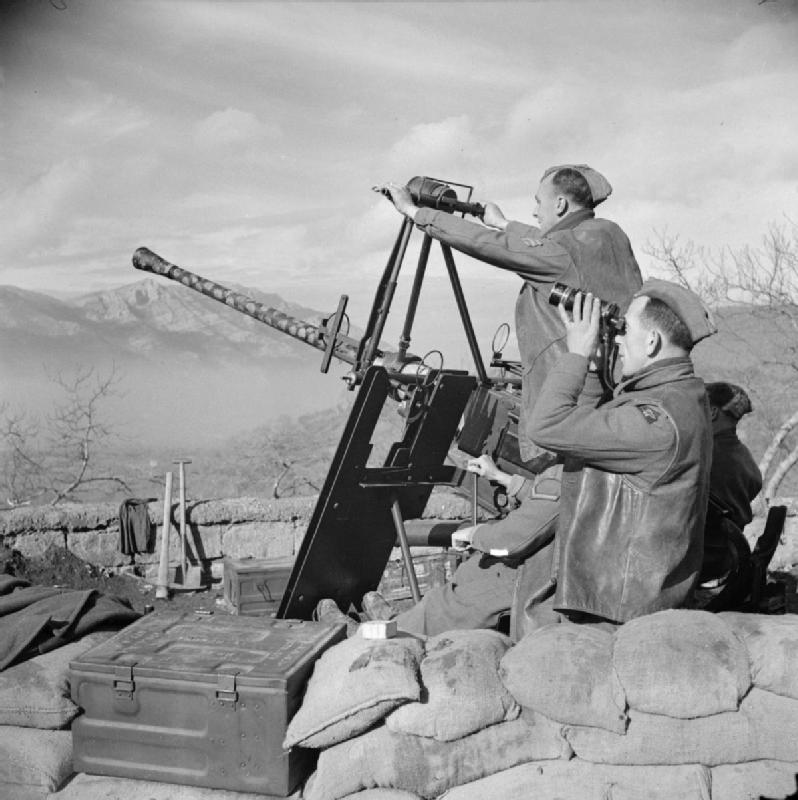
A Bofors gun crew in Italy, January 1944.

45th LAA Regiment was not involved in the Allied invasion of Sicily (Operation Husky), but entered the Italian Campaign as part of the British Eighth Army, commanded by Lieutenant General Sir Oliver Leese, in early 1944 when it rejoined 66th AA Bde. The brigade had been defending the Salerno landing area and airfields supporting the American Fifth Army, under Lieutenant General Mark Clark. After the breakout from the Anzio beachhead, in May 1944, it took over defence of that area, and it followed up as Fifth Army advanced to Rome and beyond.

== Infantry ==
By late 1944, the German Luftwaffe was suffering from such shortages of pilots, aircraft and fuel that serious aerial attacks could be discounted. At the same time the British forces in Italy were suffering an acute manpower shortage. In June 1944 the Chiefs of Staff had decided that the number of AA regiments in Italy must be reduced and their fit personnel converted to other roles, particularly infantry. 45th LAA Regiment was one of those selected for conversion, becoming 45 Garrison Regiment RA on 4 November.

On 13 February 1945, retrained as infantry, the regiment was retitled 603 Infantry Regiment RA, serving under Eighth Army in Italy for line of communication and occupation duties, which it continued after the war until it was disbanded on 1 December 1945.

== External sources ==
- The Royal Artillery 1939–45
