= 34th (South Midland) Anti-Aircraft Brigade =

- Active: 1 April 1938–31 May 1945
- Country: United Kingdom
- Branch: Territorial Army
- Type: Anti-Aircraft Brigade
- Role: Air Defence
- Part of: 4th AA Division; 11th AA Division; 4 AA Group
- Garrison/HQ: Coventry
- Engagements: Coventry Blitz; Birmingham Blitz

Commanders
- Notable commanders: Brigadier Sidney Archibald, MC

The 34th (South Midland) Anti-Aircraft Brigade (34 AA Bde) was an air defence formation of Anti-Aircraft Command in the British Territorial Army formed shortly before the outbreak of the Second World War. It defended the West Midlands of England during The Blitz.

== Origin ==
34th (South Midland) Anti-Aircraft (AA) Brigade was formed on 1 April 1938 at Coventry, and was assigned to 4th AA Division when that formation was created in Western Command on 1 September that year. They were transferred to the new AA Command in 1939, with 34 AA Bde responsible for the air defence of Coventry and Birmingham. Brigadier Sidney Archibald, MC, was appointed to command the brigade on 27 April 1938. In 1940 he became Brigadier, Royal Artillery, at Eastern Command and then Major-General, Royal Artillery, at GHQ Home Forces.

=== Order of Battle 1939 ===
On the outbreak of war the brigade controlled the following units of the Royal Artillery:

- 69th (Royal Warwickshire Regiment) Anti-Aircraft Regiment, RA – Heavy Anti-Aircraft (HAA) regiment formed in 1936 by conversion of 6th Battalion, Royal Warwickshire Regiment
  - Regimental Headquarters (RHQ), 192 and 199 AA Batteries at Kings Heath, Birmingham
  - 190 and 191 AA Batteries at Alum Rock, Birmingham
- 73rd Anti-Aircraft Regiment, RA – raised in 1937 from batteries drawn from 62nd Field Brigade and 51st (Midland) Medium Brigade, RA
  - RHQ and 209 (Wolverhampton) AA Battery at Wolverhampton
  - 222 (West Bromwich) AA Battery at West Bromwich
  - 311 AA Battery at Brierley Hill
- 95th (Birmingham) Anti-Aircraft Regiment, RA – newly raised in April 1939, with 204 Bty from 73 AA Regiment
  - RHQ and 293 AA Battery at Washwood Heath
  - 204 (Warwickshire) AA Battery at Saltley
- 34th AA Brigade Company Royal Army Service Corps

== Mobilisation ==
The TA's AA units were mobilised on 23 September 1938 during the Munich Crisis, manning their emergency positions within 24 hours, even though many did not yet have their full complement of men or equipment. The emergency lasted three weeks, and they were stood down on 13 October. In February 1939 the existing AA defences came under the control of a new Anti-Aircraft Command. In June, as the international situation worsened, a partial mobilisation of the TA was begun in a process known as 'couverture', whereby each AA unit did a month's tour of duty in rotation to man selected AA gun positions. On 24 August, ahead of the declaration of war, AA Command was fully mobilised at its war stations. The HAA guns of 34 AA Bde were concentrated in the Gun Defence Areas (GDAs) at Birmingham (24 guns) and Coventry (12 guns).

== Phoney War and Battle of Britain ==
73rd AA Regiment left the brigade in November 1939 to join the Advanced Air Striking Force in France. After the Dunkirk evacuation in May–June 1940, some AA units that had served in France with the British Expeditionary Force were sent to the West Midlands to refit and joined the brigade. In the summer of 1940 the AA regiments of the RA were redesignated Heavy Anti-Aircraft (HAA) to distinguish them from the new Light Anti-Aircraft (LAA) units being formed.

Although most of the Luftwaffe air raids during the Battle of Britain and the early part of The Blitz concentrated on London and the South and East Coasts, the West Midlands also suffered badly, with Birmingham and Coventry experiencing heavy raids in August and October.

== The Blitz ==
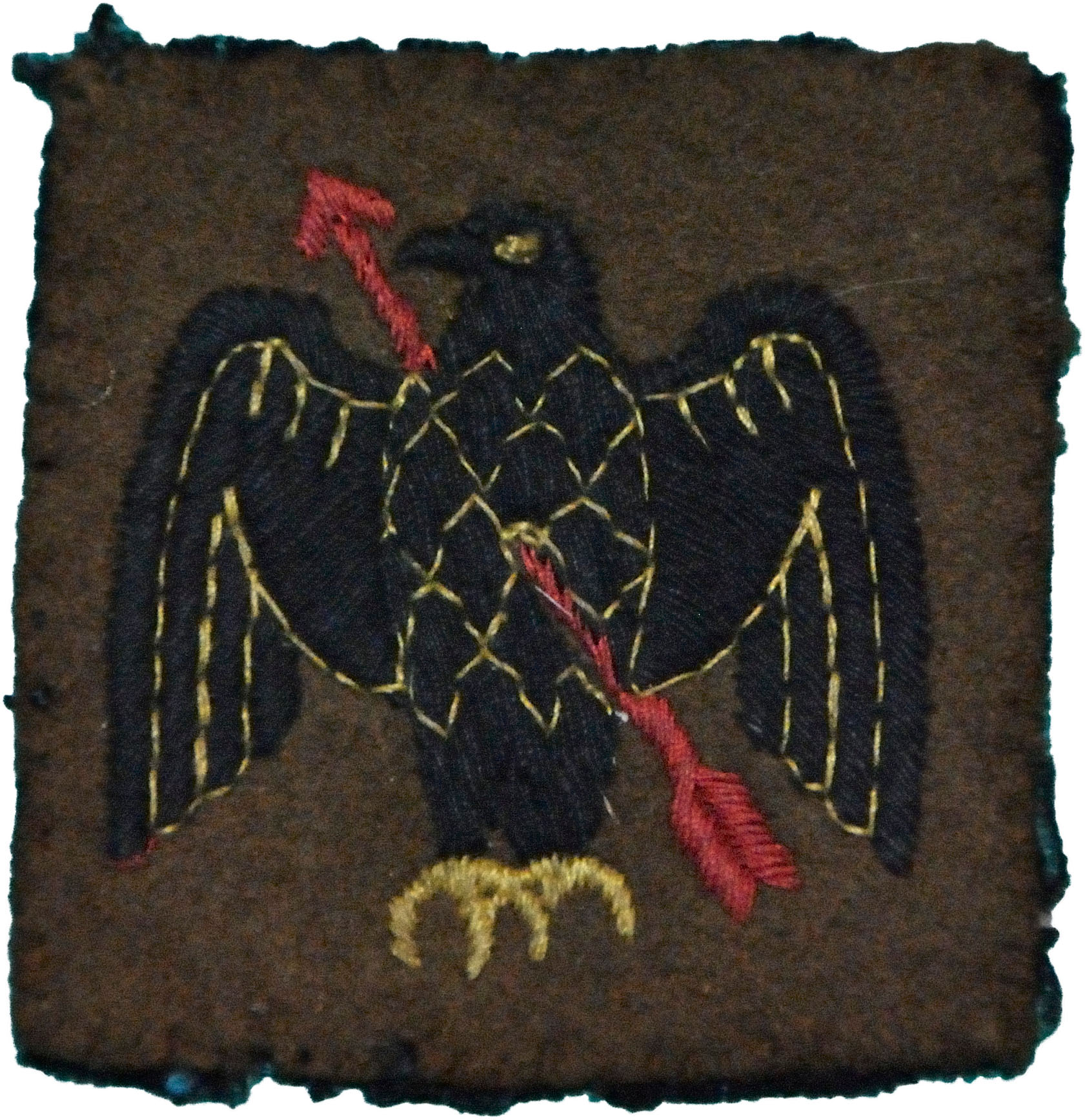
Formation sign of 11 AA Division

In November 1940 the brigade came under the command of the newly formed 11 AA Division based at Birmingham. It was commanded by Maj-Gen Archibald, formerly commander of 34 AA Bde. In the autumn the brigade was joined by 60th (City of London) HAA Rgt, re-equipped after its return from Dunkirk.

=== Coventry Blitz ===
The new division was still being formed when the Luftwaffe launched a series of devastating raids, beginning with the notorious Coventry Blitz on 14/15 November. The Coventry raid was preceded by a dozen pathfinder aircraft of Kampfgeschwader 100 riding an X-Gerät beam to drop flares and incendiary bombs on the target. The huge fires that broke out in the congested city centre then attracted successive 40-strong waves of bombers flying at heights between 12,000 and 20,000 feet to saturate the defences. The AA Defence Commander (AADC) of 95th HAA Rgt had prepared a series of concentrations to be fired using sound-locators and GL Mk. I gun-laying radar, and 128 concentrations were fired before the bombing severed all lines of communication and the noise drowned out sound-location. Some gun positions were able to fire at searchlight beam intersections, glimpsed through the smoke and guessing the range. Although the Coventry guns fired 10 rounds a minute for the whole 10-hour raid, only three aircraft were shot down over the UK that night, and the city centre was gutted. The Coventry raid was followed by three consecutive nights (19–22 November) of attacks on Birmingham and other Black Country industrial towns including West Bromwich, Dudley and Tipton.

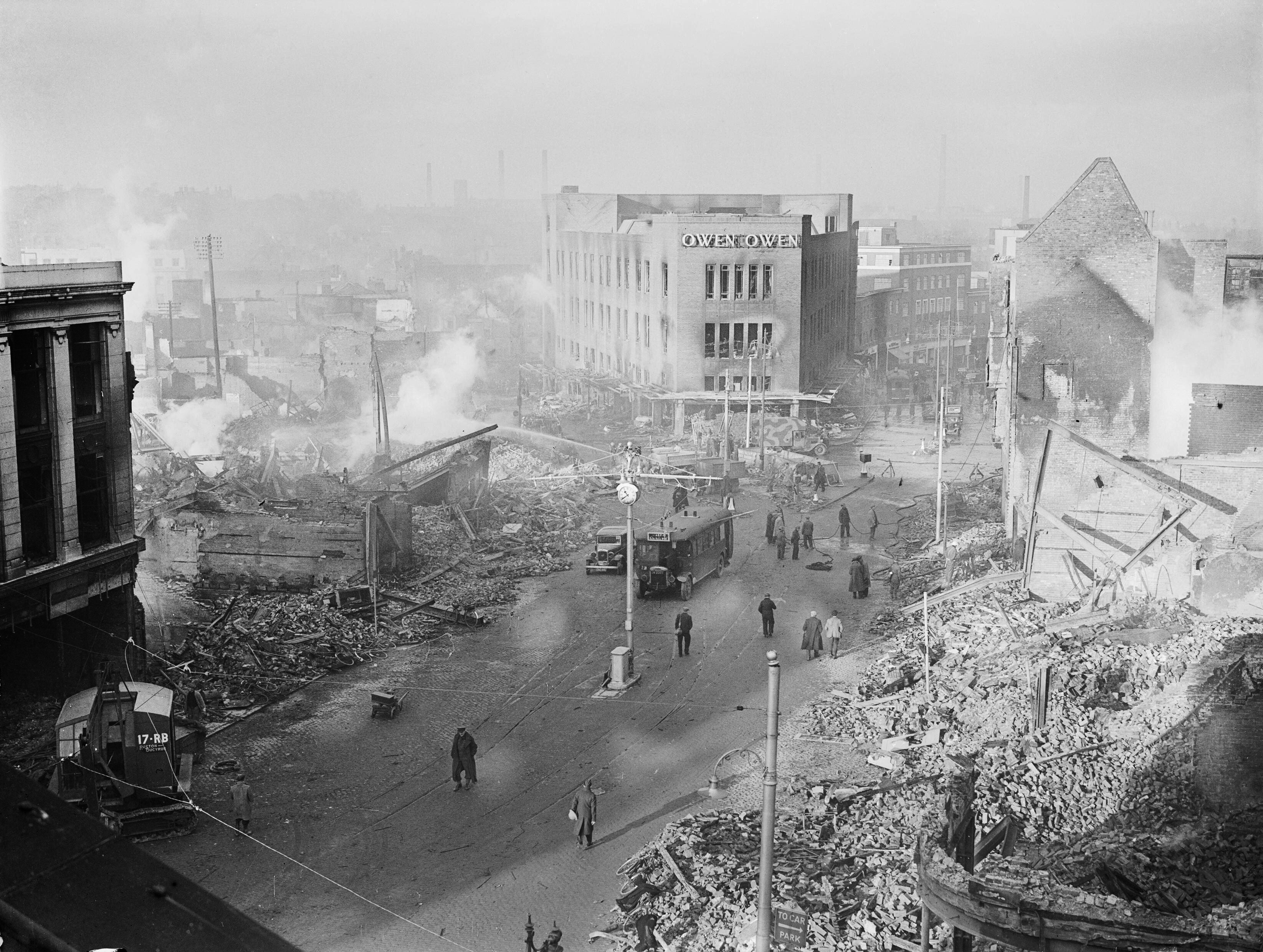
Coventry city centre following 14/15 November 1940 raid

The change in enemy tactics led to HAA guns being moved from London to the West Midlands. 6th HAA Regt, a Regular regiment that had seen action in France and been evacuated from Dunkirk, received orders on 23 November to move RHQ with 3 and 12 HAA Btys (16 x mobile 3.7-inch guns, 2 x GL sets) from the London Inner Artillery Zone to the Kidderminster/Wolverhampton area. Each battery required a convoy of 65 vehicles for this move. They were ready for action in their new positions by dusk on 24 November, with 3 HAA Bty occupying an 8-gun position (H49) at Upper Penn, south-west of Wolverhampton, Right Troop of 12 HAA Bty at Wergs (H51) and Left Trp at Bushbury (H51), both north-west of Wolverhampton. Sections of 38th (The King's Regiment) Searchlight Rgt were also present at these sites. 15 HAA Battery rejoined 6 HAA Rgt from London by train on 11 December and occupied two sites in the Castle Bromwich area, though no guns were available until 17 January 1941, when two of the older 3-inch mobile guns were installed at each site. Meanwhile, 15 HAA Bty provided anti-paratroop fighting patrols to defend 34 AA Bde HQ and the GDA Gun Operations Room (GOR) in case of invasion.

6th HAA Regiment was still regarded as a mobile unit, and in February 1941 it was warned to prepare for a mobilisation exercise. This exercise (Operation Chestnut) was carried out in Oxfordshire in March and April, though the gunsites in 34 AA Bde area remained manned. The regiment became part of the War Office (WO) Reserve, while retaining its responsibilities under AA Command.

By March 1941, a new 67 AA Bde had been created in 11 AA Division by splitting 34 AA Bde: 95th HAA Rgt and 22nd Light AA (LAA) Rgt transferred to the new formation, while 12 HAA Bty of 6th HAA Rgt moved to Kenilworth and came under its operational control.

=== Birmingham Blitz ===
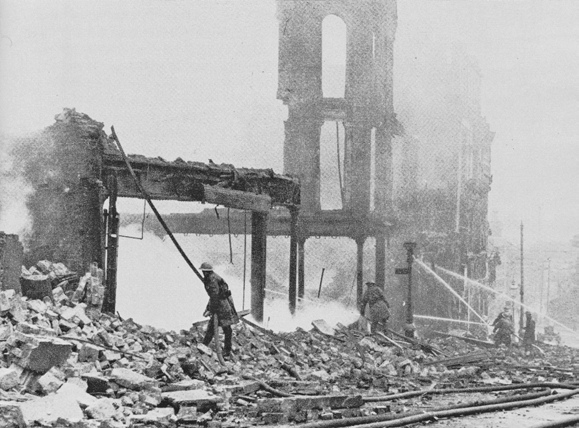
Birmingham High Street, looking towards the Bull Ring area, after heavy bombing on 10 April 1941.

Birmingham was bombed again during December (3, 4, 11) and on 11 March 1941, but the full Birmingham Blitz came in April 1941, with heavy raids on the nights of 9/10 and 10/11 of the month, causing extensive damage and casualties.

The Blitz is generally held to have ended on 16 May 1941 with another attack on Birmingham. By now the HAA sites had the advantage of GL Mk I* radar with an elevation finding (E/F or 'Effie') attachment, and several attackers were turned away by accurate fire and their bombs scattered widely, some on nearby Nuneaton. The city was attacked again in July, but the Luftwaffe bombing offensive was effectively over. The West Midlands had been the hardest hit area of the UK after London and Merseyside.

=== Order of Battle 1940–41 ===
The brigade's composition during the Blitz was as follows:

- 6th HAA Rgt – from 1 AA Division 24 November 1940
  - 3, 15 HAA Btys
  - 12 HAA Bty – attached to 67 AA Bde until May 1941
- 60th (City of London) HAA Rgt
  - 168, 169 HAA Btys
- 95th (Birmingham) HAA Rgt – to 67 AA Bde
  - 204, 293, 340 HAA Btys
- 110th HAA Rgt – new regiment raised in October 1940
  - 345, 346, 348, 354 HAA Btys
- 112th HAA Rgt – new regiment raised in October 1940; to 8 AA Division by May 1941
  - 351, 352, 353 HAA Btys
- 122nd HAA Rgt – new regiment raised in February 1941
  - 397 HAA Bty
  - 400 HAA Bty – attached to 4 AA Division
  - 401 HAA Bty – attached to 67 AA Bde
- 22nd LAA Rgt – to 67 AA Bde
  - 70, 72, 141 Btys
- 42nd LAA Rgt
  - 48, 145, 150, 231 Btys
- 10th AA 'Z' Rgt – new regiment equipped with Z Battery rocket launchers raised in January 1941
  - 116, 133, 137 Z Btys
  - 138 Z Bty – attached to 1 AA Bde in 11 AA Division

== Mid-War ==
Newly formed AA units joined the brigade, the HAA units increasingly being 'mixed' ones into which women of the Auxiliary Territorial Service were integrated. At the same time, experienced units were posted away for service overseas. 6th HAA Regiment was relieved by 71st (Forth) HAA Rgt and left in September 1941 for Middle East Forces (MEF); en route it was diverted to the Far East and its batteries were captured at the Fall of Singapore in February 1942 and Java in March 1942.

This continual turnover of units accelerated in 1942 with the preparations for Operation Torch and the need to relocate guns to counter the Baedeker Blitz and the Luftwaffe's hit-and-run attacks against South Coast towns.

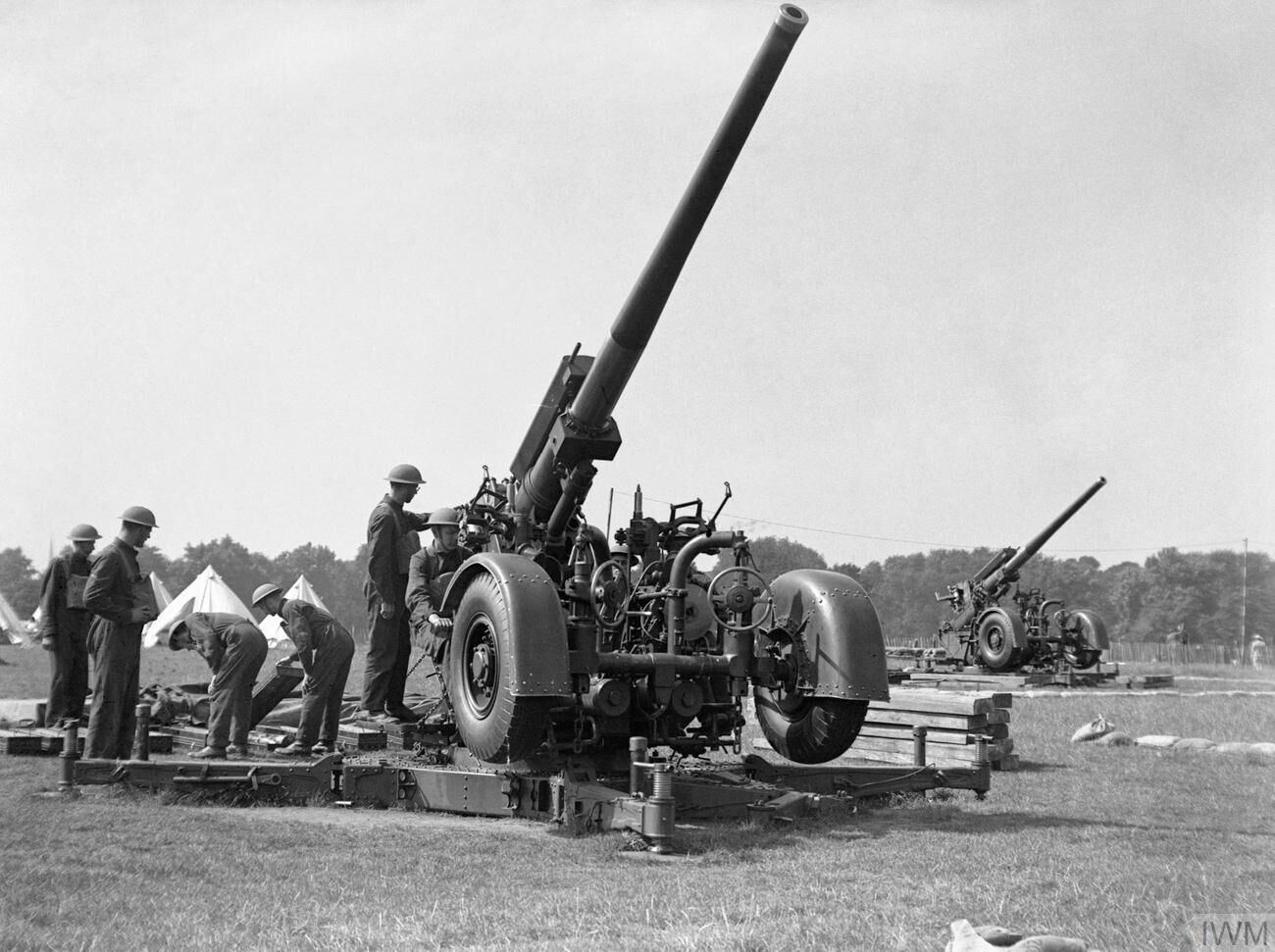
Mobile 3.7-inch HAA guns in action, early in the Second World War.

=== Order of Battle 1941–42 ===
During this period 34 AA Bde was composed as follows:

- 6th HAA Rgt – left for overseas service September 1941
- 55th (Kent) HAA Rgt – from 6 AA Division by December 1941; to WO control December 1941, left February 1942 for Persia and Iraq Command (PAIFORCE)
  - 163, 166, 307 HAA Btys
- 57th (Wessex) HAA Rgt – from 1 AA Division March 1942; to 9 AA Division May 1942
  - 213, 214, 215 HAA Btys
- 60th HAA Rgt – to 68 AA Bde, 11 AA Division, Summer 1941
  - 168, 169 HAA Btys
  - 206 HAA Bty – from 58th (Kent) HAA Rgt, 6 AA Division, June 1941
- 65th (Manchester Regiment) HAA Rgt – from Orkney and Shetland Defences (OSDEF) May 1941; left AA Command by May 1942, later MEF
  - 181, 182, 196 Btys
  - 183 Bty – left Summer 1941
  - 432 Bty – joined Summer 1941
- 66th (Leeds Rifles) HAA Rgt – from 10 AA Division January 1942; to WO reserve February 1942, arrived in India May 1942
  - 184, 186, 296, 421 HAA Btys
- 71st (Forth) HAA Rgt – from 3 AA Division September 1941 while in WO Reserve; to WO Control by April 1942, later to Operation Torch
  - 227, 229, 317, 325 HAA Btys
- 95th HAA Rgt – returned from 67 AA Bde December 1941; left January 1942, arrived in India April 1942
- 107th HAA Rgt – from 4 AA Division by May 1942; to 5 AA Division June 1942
  - 334, 335, 337, 390 HAA Btys
- 110th HAA Rgt – to OSDEF May 1941
- 122nd HAA Rgt – to 67 AA Bde by December 1941
  - 397, 400 Btys
  - 401 Bty – attached to 67 AA Bde until Summer 1941
- 134th (Mixed) HAA Rgt – new regiment formed in September 1941
  - 456 (M) HAA Bty – to new 168 (M) HAA Rgt August 1942
  - 459 (M) HAA Bty – attached to 4 AA Division August 1942; attached to 68 AA Bde September 1942
  - 460, 461 (M) HAA Btys
- 142nd (Mixed) HAA Rgt – from 67 AA Bde June 1942
  - 477, 488, 492, 534 (M) HAA Btys
- 22nd LAA Rgt – returned from 67 AA Bde Summer 1941; to 54 AA Bde, 11 AA Division, June 1942
  - 70, 72, 141 LAA Btys
- 42nd LAA Rgt – left Summer 1941; to MEF by December 1941
- 10th AA 'Z' Rgt – to 67 AA Bde May 1941; returned by December 1941
  - 116, 133, 137, 138, 185 Z Btys
- 34 AA Brigade Signal Office Mixed Sub-Section (part of No 2 Company, 11 AA Division Mixed Signal Unit, Royal Corps of Signals)

== Later war ==
A reorganisation of AA Command in October 1942 saw the AA divisions disbanded and replaced by a number of AA Groups more closely aligned with the groups of RAF Fighter Command. 11 AA Division merged into 4 AA Group covering the West Midlands and North West England and cooperating with 9 Group RAF.

By March 1944 AA Command was being forced to release manpower to 21st Army Group for the planned Allied invasion of continental Europe (Operation Overlord), and most regiments lost a battery.

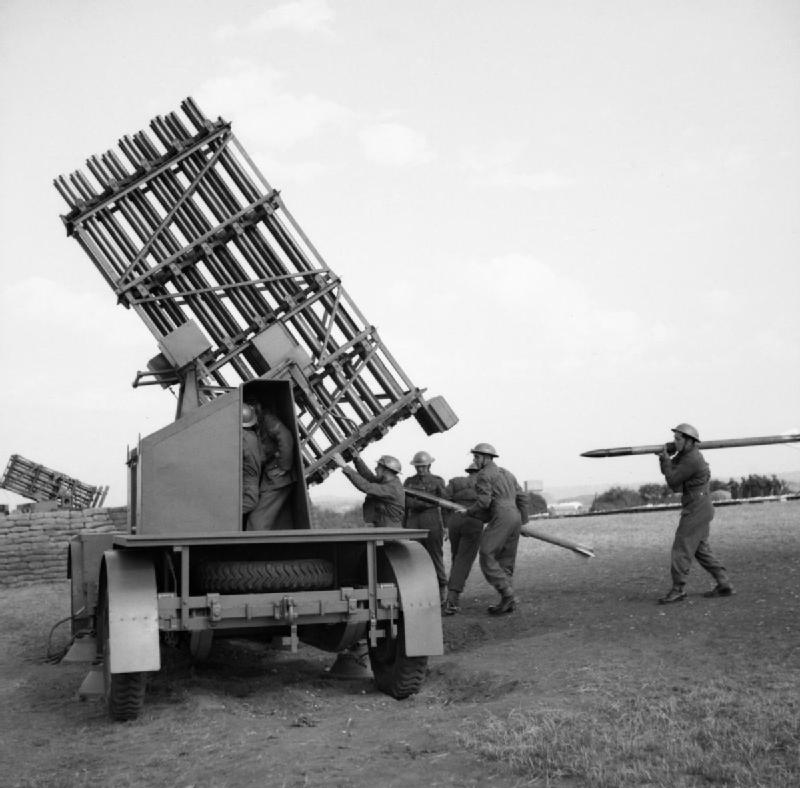
Loading a mobile multiple Z Battery launcher

=== Order of Battle 1942–44 ===
During this period 34 AA Bde was composed as follows:

- 134th (M) HAA Rgt – to 6 AA Group March 1944
  - 459, 460, 461, 583 (M) HAA Btys
- 142nd (M) HAA Rgt – to 1 AA Group September 1944
  - 477 (M) HAA Bty – attached to 33 (Western) AA Bde, 4 AA Group, until April 1943
  - 488 (M) HAA Bty – attached to 33 (Western) AA Bde during May 1943
  - 492 (M) HAA Bty – left May 1944
  - 534 (M) HAA Bty – attached to 33 (Western) AA Bde from May 1943
- 168th (M) HAA Rgt – new regiment raised in August 1942; to 2 AA Group January 1944
  - 456 (M) HAA Bty – attached to 68 AA Bde until December 1942
  - 557, 559, 611 (M) HAA Btys
- 170th (M) HAA Rgt – from 2 AA Group January 1944
  - 528, 554, 567 (M) HAA Btys
  - 568 (M) HAA Bty – left February 1944
- 111th LAA Rgt – from 54 AA Bde May 1943; to 61 AA Bde, 4 AA Group, May 1944
  - 348 LAA Bty – left November 1943
  - 349, 350 LAA Btys
  - 363 LAA Bty – left by March 1944
- 10th (M) AA 'Z' Rgt
  - 137, 138, 185, 223 Z Btys
  - 231 Z Bty – joined January 1943
- 18th (M) AA 'Z' Rgt – new regiment raised in October 1942
  - 115 Z Bty – until September 1943
  - 116 Z Bty – joined September 1943
  - 133, 199, 200 Z Btys
  - 193 Z Bty – joined January 1943; left by March 1944
- 34 AA Brigade Signal Office Mixed Sub-Section (part of 4 Mixed Signal Company, 4 AA Group Mixed Signal Unit)

AA 'Z' Rgts were redesignated AA Area Mixed Rgts in April 1944.

== Operation Diver ==
Shortly after D-Day, the Germans began launching V-1 flying bombs, codenamed 'Divers', against London. These presented AA Command's biggest challenge since the Blitz. Defences had been planned against this new form of attack (Operation Diver), but it presented a severe problem for AA guns, and after two weeks' experience AA Command carried out a major reorganisation, stripping guns from the Midlands and repositioning them along the South Coast to target V-1s coming in over the English Channel. As the launching sites in Northern France were overrun by 21st Army Group, the Luftwaffe began air-launching V-1s from the North Sea, and further HAA batteries had to stripped from the Midlands and repositioned along the East Coast.

=== Order of Battle 1944–45 ===
During this period 34 AA Bde was composed as follows:

- 148th (M) HAA Rgt – from 1 AA Group November 1944; left late December
  - 624, 629 (M) HAA Btys – left early December 1944
  - 631, 633 (M) HAA Btys
- 168th (M) HAA Rgt – returned from 1 AA Group November 1944; left December 1944
  - 557, 559, 611 (M) HAA Btys
- 170th (M) HAA Rgt – left December 1944
  - 528, 554, 567 (M) HAA Btys
- 8th AA Area Mixed Rgt – joined by February, disbanded March 1945
- 10th AA Area Mixed Rgt
- 18th AA Area Mixed Rgt
- 24th AA Area Mixed Rgt – joined by February, disbanded March 1945

In October 1944, the brigade's HQ establishment was 9 officers, 8 male other ranks and 25 members of the ATS, together with a small number of attached drivers, cooks and mess orderlies (male and female). In addition, the brigade's Mixed Signal Office Section comprised 5 male other ranks and 19 ATS.

== Disbandment ==
The reduction in activity by the German Luftwaffe towards the end of the war saw a drastic reduction in AA defences.4 AA Group was disbanded in mid-March 1945, and 34 AA Bde transferred to the command of 5 AA Group. By this time, the brigade consisted solely of the rocket batteries of 10th and 18th AA Area Mixed Rgts, and these were disbanded in April.

Immediately after VE Day, the Brigade HQ became 34 AA Area Maintenance HQ and took over control of 11 AA Area Maintenance HQ. Shortly afterwards it disappeared from the order of battle.

When the TA was reformed in 1947, the AA Bdes were renumbered: the number 60 was reserved for a reconstituted 34 AA Bde, but was never used, and the brigade was never reformed.

== Online sources ==
- British Army units from 1945 on
- British Military History
- Generals of World War II
- Orders of Battle at Patriot Files
- The Royal Artillery 1939–45
- Graham Watson, The Territorial Army 1947
