= 78th Searchlight Regiment, Royal Artillery =

78th Searchlight Regiment, RA
- Royal Artillery cap badge
- Active: 20 August 1940 – 8 September 1943
- Country: United Kingdom
- Branch: British Army
- Type: Searchlight Regiment
- Role: Air Defence
- Size: 3–4 Batteries
- Part of: 11th Anti-Aircraft Division
- Engagements: The Blitz

78th Searchlight Regiment (78th S/L Rgt), was an air defence unit of Britain's Royal Artillery during World War II. It protected the United Kingdom as part of Anti-Aircraft Command from the Blitz of 1940 until 1943.

== Origin ==
90 cm 'Projector Anti-Aircraft', displayed at Fort Nelson, Hampshire.

The regiment was created as part of the rapid expansion of anti-aircraft (AA) defences during the Battle of Britain. It was formed on 20 August 1940 with three batteries, 498, 499 and 500. After training, the new regiment joined 1st AA Brigade. This was a Regular Army formation that had served in the Battle of France and then been evacuated from Dunkirk. Back in the UK, the headquarters was redeployed to 11th AA Division of AA Command to cover the industrial area round the industrial areas round Crewe and across Staffordshire.

== The Blitz ==
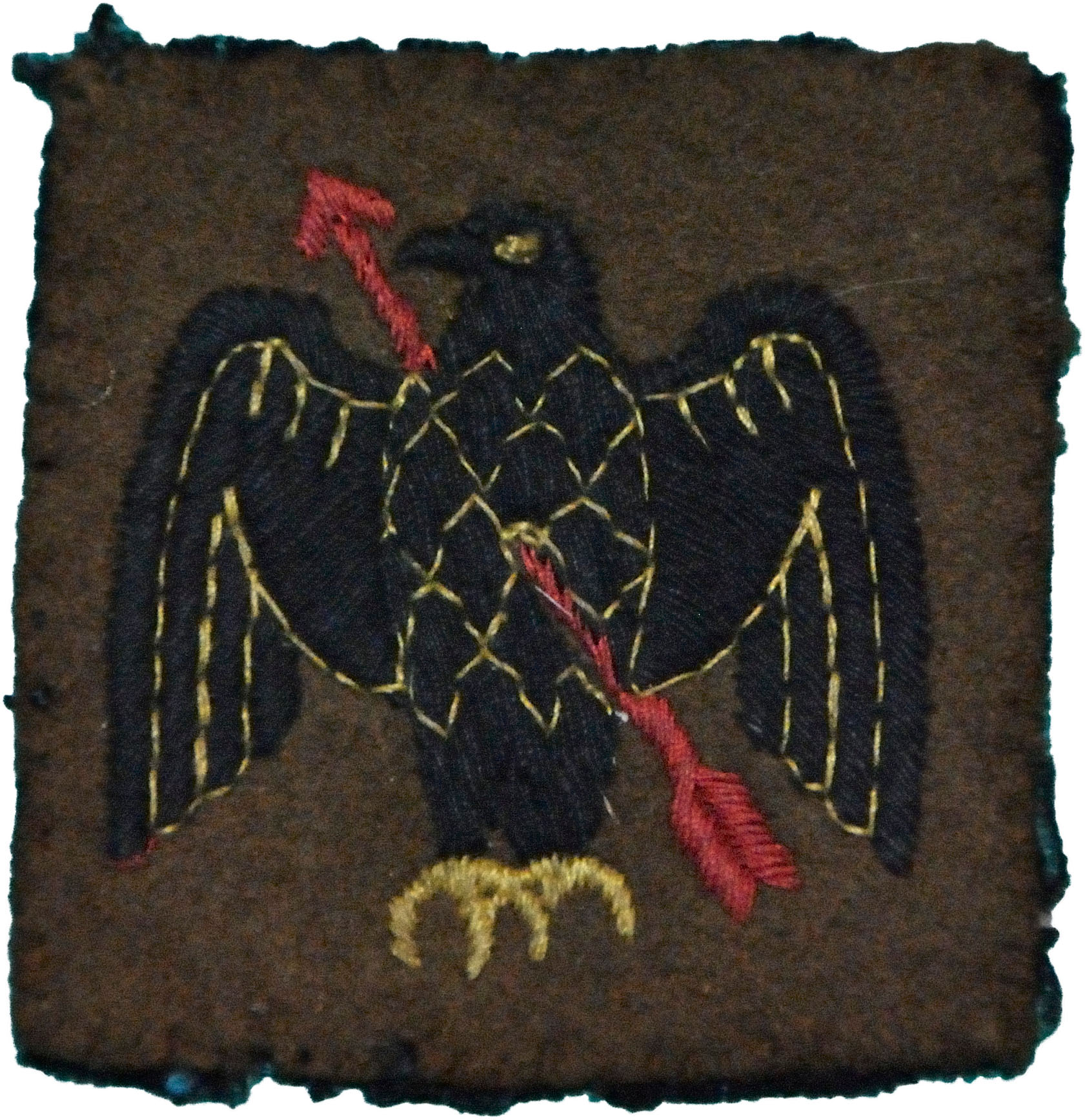
Formation sign of 11th AA Division.

By the time 78th S/L Rgt joined, The Blitz was in full swing, with frequent night air raids on the industrial cities. The role of the S/L units was to track and illuminate raiders for the Heavy AA (HAA) guns of the Gun Defence Areas (GDAs) and for the few available Royal Air Force Night fighters. In November 1940 AA Command changed its S/L layouts to clusters of three lights to improve illumination, but this meant that the clusters had to be spaced 10,400 yards (9,500 m) apart. The cluster system was an attempt to improve the chances of picking up enemy bombers and keeping them illuminated for engagement by AA guns or night fighters. Eventually, one light in each cluster was to be equipped with Searchlight Control radar (SLC) and act as 'master light', but the radar equipment was still in short supply. In April and May 1941, Merseyside and the North Midlands were particularly badly bombed (the Liverpool Blitz).

Although operating within AA Command during the Blitz, 1st AA Bde HQ remained part of the War Office Reserve, available for service in the field. By the end of the Blitz in mid-May 1941 it had handed over its responsibilities and units, including 78th SL Rgt, to a new 68th AA Bde and left AA Command. (Later in the year 1st AA Bde HQ went to the Middle East.)

On 13 May 1941 78th S/L Rgt was joined by 551 S/L Bty, which had been formed on 16 January by 236th S/L Training Rgt at Oswestry, from a cadre of experienced officers and men supplied by 59th (Warwickshire) S/L Rgt.

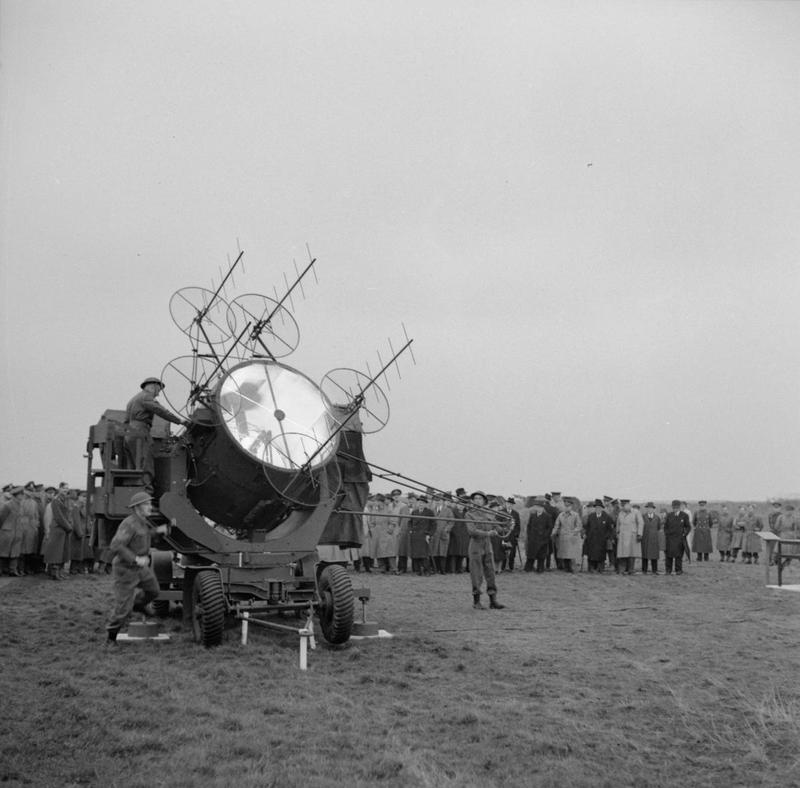
150 cm Searchlight fitted with No. 2 Mk VI SLC radar.

== Mid-War ==
By October 1941 the availability of SLC was sufficient to allow AA Command's S/L sites to be 'declustered' into single-light sites spaced at 10,400 yards (9,500 m) intervals in 'Indicator Belts' in the approaches to the GDAs, and 'Killer Belts' at 6,000 yards (5,500 m) spacing to cooperate with the RAF's night-fighters.

The regiment remained in 68th AA Bde in 11th AA Division throughout this period. A reorganisation of AA Command in October 1942 saw the AA divisions disbanded and replaced by a smaller number of AA Groups more closely aligned with the groups of RAF Fighter Command. Thus 11th AA Division merged with 4th AA Division into 4th AA Group based at Preston and cooperating with No. 9 Group RAF. By March 1943 499 S/L Bty was detached to 53rd AA Bde within 4th AA Group.AA Bde.

== Disbandment ==
By 1943, AA Command was suffering a manpower crisis: it was required to release units and personnel to the field armies and was itself still short of Light AA (LAA) gun units, but it was over-provided with S/L units. The solution was to convert existing S/L units or to disband them and redistribute the personnel. On 31 May 499 S/L Bty was disbanded. Then on 24 July 498 and 500 S/L Btys became independent while Regimental HQ and the remaining battery, 551, were reduced to a cadre; they were disbanded on 8 September. Of the two independent batteries, 500 began the process of disbandment on 15 December, completing it by 7 January 1944, while 498 transferred C and D Troops to 310 Independent HAA Bty on 28 February 1944 and the rest of the battery began disbanding, completing the process by 20 March.

A new 78th S/L Rgt was formed in the Regular Army in 1947 by redesignation of 1st S/L Rgt; on 3 September 1948 it was converted into 78th HAA Rgt.
