= 1st Anti-Aircraft Brigade (United Kingdom) =

- Active: 1920–1955
- Country: United Kingdom
- Branch: British Army
- Type: Anti-Aircraft Brigade
- Role: Air Defence
- Part of: Aldershot Command; GHQ troops, BEF; 11th AA Division; Eighth Army; 1 AA Group
- Garrison/HQ: Aldershot Garrison
- Engagements: Battle of France; Dunkirk evacuation The Blitz; North African Campaign

1st Anti-Aircraft Brigade was an Air Defence formation of the British Army, during the Second World War, and served in the Battle of France and during The Blitz. It then transferred to the Middle East, where it defended the Eighth Army's lines of communication during the final phases of the North African Campaign.

== Origin ==
The brigade was created on 8 December 1920, at Blackdown Barracks near Aldershot in Hampshire, when its first commander, Colonel Edward Ashmore was appointed. It was initially designated 1st Air Defence Brigade, then (because of confusion with the regimental-size artillery 'brigades') 1st Anti-Aircraft Group. It formed part of Aldershot Command and had the following composition:

- 1st Anti-Aircraft Brigade, Royal Garrison Artillery (RGA)
  - 1st, 2nd and 3rd AA Batteries
- 1st Anti-Aircraft Searchlight Battalion, Royal Engineers (RA)
- Air Defence Brigade Signals, Royal Corps of Signals

The RGA was merged into the RA in 1923. In 1939, the RA adopted the designation of regiment instead of brigade for its units. The resulted in the title of brigade being solely used at the more traditional formation level. The 1st Anti-Aircraft Group then became the 1st Anti-Aircraft Brigade.

== Mobilisation ==
On the outbreak of war on 3 September 1939, 1st AA Bde had the following composition:

- 6th Anti-Aircraft Regiment, RA
  - 3rd, 12th and 15th AA Batteries
- 1st Light Anti-Aircraft Battery, RA
- 1st Anti-Aircraft Battalion, RE
  - A and B Anti-Aircraft Companies (searchlights)
- 1st and 2nd Anti-Aircraft Brigade Signals, RCS

== Battle of France ==
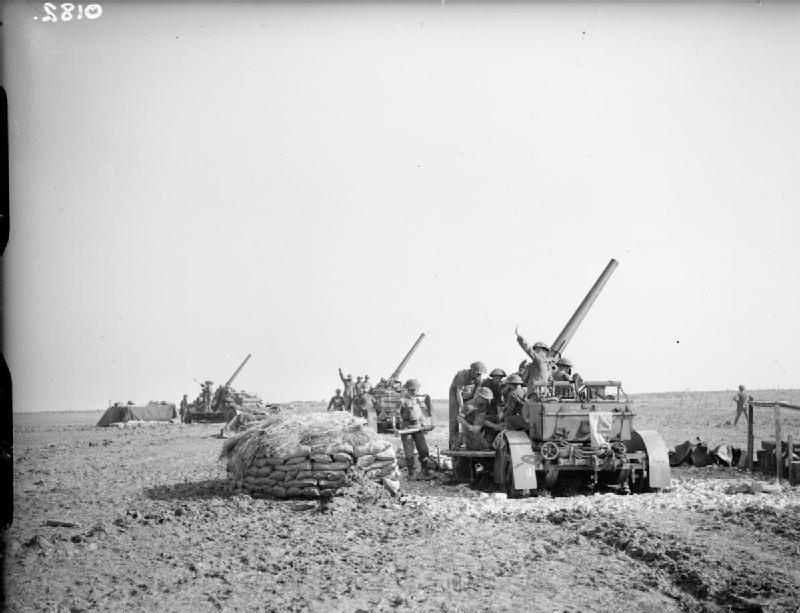
3-inch AA guns of 2nd AA Battery, 1st AA Brigade, near BEF HQ at Wanquelin, France, 19 October 1939.

The brigade proceeded to France with the British Expeditionary Force (BEF). The two AA regiments were each equipped with 16 obsolescent 3-inch guns and eight of the newer 3.7-inch heavy AA (HAA) guns. 54th (Argyll and Sutherland Highlanders) Light Anti-Aircraft Regiment, RA (a Territorial Army (TA) unit) joined by November 1939 (less one of its batteries). It was equipped with 12 x 40 mm Bofors Guns and 12 x Vickers 2-pounders, but left to become a Corps unit before the end of the Phoney War. In January 1940, 1st AA Battalion was transferred from the Royal Engineers to the Royal Artillery as 1st Searchlight Regiment and joined 5th Searchlight Brigade. Lieutenant-Colonel E.D. Milligan was promoted from 6th AA Regiment to command the brigade.

When the Battle of France opened on 10 May 1940, 1st AA Bde was attached to General Headquarters BEF, with the following composition:

Commander: Brigadier E.D. Milligan

- 1st Anti-Aircraft Regiment, RA
  - 1st, 2nd and 17th Batteries - swapped 1st & 2nd Batteries for 15th & 16th Batteries on 1 February 1940
- 6th Anti-Aircraft Regiment, RA
  - 3rd, 12th and 15th Batteries
- 85th (Tees) Anti-Aircraft Regiment, RA – crossed to France 5 April 1940 with 24 x 3.7-inch guns
  - 174th (North Riding), 175th (North Riding) and 220th (County of Durham) Batteries

1st AA Brigade's role was to cover corps assembly areas and the routes used by the BEF to advance into Belgium. When the German Army broke through, forcing the BEF to begin withdrawing again, the AA batteries gave cover leap-frog fashion. Soon they were sucked into the ground battle, split into sub-units to join rearguard actions or moved back from one key point to another. The brigade commander and his staff had no radio net and could only keep in touch by motor vehicle, and all the roads were choked with refugees. When the BEF reached Dunkirk and began its evacuation, the Major-General AA, Hugh Martin, set out from De Panne by road on 28 May to make contact with the retreating AA units and organise air defences. By now, 1st AA Brigade was down to 20 out of its original 72 HAA guns. Martin ordered 11 of these to be sent to Bray beach and the remainder to be disabled. 52nd (East Lancashire) Light Anti-Aircraft Regiment, RA (TA) (154th, 155th and 156th LAA Batteries) had started the campaign attached to I Corps and had been heavily engaged during the retreat. Now it joined 1st AA Bde on the Dunkirk beaches. The AA units attempted to cover the shrinking Dunkirk 'pocket' against air attack until it was their turn to destroy their equipment and join the queues of men waiting to be taken aboard small boats back to England.

== The Blitz ==
AA units returning from France were rapidly reinforced, re-equipped where possible, and redeployed for integration into Anti-Aircraft Command's existing defence plans for the United Kingdom. AA regiments were now designated either Heavy (HAA) or Light (LAA). 1st AA Brigade HQ and 1st HAA Regiment were sent to Crewe to reform. By November 1940 they had joined a new 11th AA Division, which took over responsibility for the West Midlands; the brigade's specific responsibility was to cover the industrial areas round Crewe and Staffordshire, and to provide LAA air defences for airfields and other Vulnerable Points. The brigade now had the following composition:

- 1st HAA Rgt
  - 1st, 2nd, 17th HAA Btys - 1st & 2nd Batteries returned on the 20th June 1940
- 106th HAA Rgt – new regiment raised in August 1940, later joined Allied Force Headquarters (AFHQ) in North Africa
  - 327, 331, 332, 408 HAA Btys
- 45th LAA Rgt – new regiment raised in July 1940, later joined AFHQ November 1942
  - 102, 135, 142 LAA Btys
- 63rd LAA Rgt – new regiment raised in October 1940, later joined AFHQ November 1942
  - 188, 189, 190 LAA Btys
- 61st (South Lancashire) S/L Rgt – converted from 5th Battalion South Lancashire Regiment August 1940, later became 61st Garrison Regiment, Royal Artillery
  - 432nd, 433rd and 434th S/L Btys
- 78th S/L Rgt – new regiment raised in August 1940, disbanded September 1943
  - 498, 499, 500, 551 S/L Bty
- 83rd S/L Rgt – new regiment raised January 1941 at Crewe, disbanded December 1944
  - 513, 514, 515 S/L Btys

At this time The Blitz was in full swing, with frequent night air raids on the industrial cities. The role of the S/L units was to track and illuminate raiders for the HAA guns of the Gun Defence Areas (GDAs) and for the few available Royal Air Force Night fighters. New tactics included grouping the S/Ls in clusters, and later in 'killer belts' for the fighters and 'indicator belts' for the guns as the raiders approached the GDAs. In April and May 1941, Merseyside and the North Midlands were particularly badly bombed (the Liverpool Blitz).

Although operating within AA Command during the Blitz, 1st AA Bde HQ together with 1st HAA Rgt remained part of the War Office Reserve, available for service in the field. By mid-May 1941 it had handed over its units and responsibilities to a new 68th AA Bde and left AA Command.

== North Africa ==
1st AA Brigade HQ left the UK by October 1941, and by the end of the year was in the Middle East. In January 1942 the brigade took over responsibility for the GDAs in Palestine under the command of Ninth Army. It was relieved in August 1942, and moved to Egypt to join Eighth Army in the North African Campaign.

After Eighth Army broke through the Axis positions at the Second Battle of El Alamein and began its pursuit across Libya, the AA units were leap-frogged forwards to cover the important objectives as they were taken. 1st AA Brigade moved up from Egypt to relieve 2nd AA Bde at Tobruk, then was in turn relieved by 17th AA Bde and moved on to Benghazi. As well as these ports, it was also involved in the defence of airfields for the supporting fighters and bombers of the Desert Air Force.

By January 1943, 1st AA Bde was deployed around Benghazi and Agedabia and at nearby landing grounds, with the following order of battle:

- 51st (London) HAA Regiment
  - 152nd, 153rd, 242nd HAA Batteries – 24 x 3.7-inch guns
- 69th (Royal Warwickshire Regiment) HAA Regiment
  - 192nd, 199th, 200th HAA Batteries – 24 x 3.7-inch guns
  - 135th Z Battery – 16 x rocket projectors
- 89th (Cinque Ports) HAA Regiment– moving up to relieve 51st HAA Rgt – 24 x 3.7-inch guns
- 2nd LAA Regiment
  - 6th, 155th LAA Batteries – 24 x Bofors guns
  - 171 Battery from 57th LAA Rgt – 12 x Bofors guns
  - 390th S/L Battery – 12 x S/Ls
- 37th (Tyne Electrical Engineers) LAA Regiment
  - 123rd, 124th, 222nd LAA Btys – 36 x Bofors guns
- 57th (King's Own Yorkshire Light Infantry) LAA Regiment – on loan from 4th Indian Division
  - 169th, 170th LAA Batteries – 24 x Bofors guns

When the North African Campaign ended in May 1943 with the Axis surrender in Tunisia, AA defence in the rear areas was under new headquarters. 1st AA Brigade – still at Benghazi and landing grounds – now came under AA Defence Area Cyrenaica, under No. 212 Group RAF. The brigade had the following composition:

- 89th HAA Regiment
- 28th HAA Bty, 9th HAA Regiment
- One Troop, 135th 'Z' Battery
- 13th LAA Regiment
- 96th LAA Regiment
- 390th S/L Battery, detached from 27th London Electrical Engineers S/L Regiment
- Two AA Operations Rooms

As the war moved further away from North Africa, 1st AA Bde was redeployed back to the eastern end of the Mediterranean, so that by 1 January 1944 it was responsible for the Levant area, including Haifa, Homs and Baalbek, with the following composition:

- 74th (City of Glasgow) HAA Regiment
- 102nd HAA Regiment
- 16th LAA Regiment
- 37th LAA Regiment
- 80th LAA Regiment
- 390th S/L Battery

In June 1944 it was still in the Levant area, and had added Cyprus to its responsibilities, with the following composition:

- 2nd HAA Regiment
- 1st HAA Regiment, Hong Kong–Singapore Royal Artillery
- 181st HAA Battery, 65th HAA Regiment
- 257th HAA Battery, 83rd HAA Regiment
- 37th LAA Regiment
- 243rd Bty, 46th LAA Regiment
- 1st Palestinian Independent LAA Battery
- 219th Independent LAA Battery
- 390th S/L Battery

== Postwar ==
By 1947, 1 AA Bde had been reformed in 1 AA Group, which covered London and South East England, with the following composition:.

- 30 LAA Regiment – converted to HAA September 1948; to British Army of the Rhine March 1951
- 90 LAA Regiment – disbanded September 1948
- 95 HAA Regiment – became 65 HAA Regiment September 1948
- 1 & 9 Fire Control (FC) Troops

After Anti-Aircraft Command was disbanded on 10 March 1955, HQ 1 AA Bde was converted into a Territorial Army formation based at Edenbridge, Kent, and renumbered 30 AA Bde. That formation in turn was disbanded in 1961.

== External sources ==
- British Military History
- Patriot Files
- Royal Artillery 1939–1945
- British Army units from 1945 on
- Graham Watson, The Territorial Army 1947
