= 59th (Warwickshire) Searchlight Regiment, Royal Artillery =

59th (Warwickshire) Searchlight Regiment 148th (Warwickshire) LAA Regiment 594th (Warwickshire) LAA Regiment
- Royal Artillery cap badge (pre-1953)
- Active: 1 November 1938–1969
- Country: United Kingdom
- Branch: Territorial Army
- Role: Air Defence
- Part of: Anti-Aircraft Command; 61st Infantry Division
- Garrison/HQ: Birmingham

The 59th (Warwickshire) Searchlight Regiment, Royal Artillery was an air defence unit of the Territorial Army (TA), part of the British Army, and was raised in Birmingham in 1938 just before the Second World War. It later served as a light anti-aircraft gun unit and continued in the postwar TA.

== Origin ==
90 cm Projector Anti-Aircraft, displayed at Fort Nelson, Hampshire.

The unit was formed on 1 November 1938 when the 399th Anti-Aircraft (AA) Company was transferred from the 45th (The Royal Warwickshire Regiment) AA Battalion, a TA searchlight unit of the Royal Engineers (RE), to the Royal Artillery (RA) to provide the cadre for a new unit, entitled 59th (Warwickshire) Searchlight Regiment, RA (TA). 45 AA Bn had itself been formed two years before by converting the 5th Battalion of the Royal Warwickshire Regiment. The new unit had the following organisation:

- Regiment Headquarters (RHQ) at Coventry – raised 1 November 1938
- 399 AA Battery at Birmingham
- 427 AA Battery at Birmingham – raised 1 November 1938
- 428 AA Battery at Birmingham – raised 1 November 1938

== World War II ==
=== Mobilisation ===
4th AA Division's formation sign.

In February 1939, the existing AA defences came under the control of a new Anti-Aircraft Command. In June, a partial mobilisation of TA units was begun in a process known as 'couverture', whereby each AA unit did a month's tour of duty in rotation to man selected AA and searchlight positions. On 24 August, ahead of the declaration of war, AA Command was fully mobilised at its war stations.

At the outbreak of war in September 1939, 59 S/L Rgt formed part of 54th Anti-Aircraft Brigade, a new formation based at Sutton Coldfield being formed within AA Command's 4th Anti-Aircraft Division.

The regiment supplied a cadre of experienced officers and men to 236th LAA Training Rgt at Oswestry where it provided the basis for a new 551 S/L Bty formed on 16 January 1941. This battery later joined 78th S/L Rgt.

On 19 March 1942 the regiment was joined by 516 S/L Bty from 71st (East Lancashire) S/L Rgt, and the following month 59 S/L Rgt was transferred to the Orkney and Shetland Defences (OSDEF) under AA Command, serving on Orkney to protect the Royal Navy's base at Scapa Flow. It moved to 36th (Scottish) Anti-Aircraft Brigade in East Scotland and Northern Ireland in August 1942. On 20 February 1943, 516 S/L Bty transferred away to 57th (8th Cameronians) S/L Rgt.

=== 148th (Warwickshire) LAA Regiment ===
On 7 April 1943, while it was based at Holywood, County Down, the regiment was given a new role and title as 148th (Warwickshire) Light Anti-Aircraft Regiment, Royal Artillery, with the following organisation:

- 498 (Coventry) Battery – converted from 399 Bty
- 499 (Sheldon) Battery – converted from 427 Bty
- 500 (Shirley) Battery – converted from 428 Bty

61st Infantry Division's formation sign.

From 2 March 1944, 148 LAA Rgt served with 61st Infantry Division (a training formation in Eastern England) for the remainder of the war.

After VE Day, the batteries became independent: 499 on 4 July 1945, 498 on 17 July and 500 on 3 August; 500 LAA Bty then disbanded on 31 August at Lewes, Sussex. RHQ was then joined by three other batteries on 15 August 1945:

- 11 (Supplementary Reserve) LAA Bty from 178th Heavy AA Rgt
- 56 LAA Bty from 144th LAA Rgt
- 432 LAA Bty from 131st LAA Rgt

(During the war both 11 and 56 LAA Btys had served under 178th HAA Rgt in the Faroe Islands garrison.)

== Postwar ==
Of the regiment's original batteries, 499 had disbanded by 5 January and 498 by 11 January 1946. RHQ with 56 and 432 LAA Btys passed into suspended animation on 6 May 1946 at Citadel Barracks, Dover, when 11 (SR) LAA Bty transferred to 3rd LAA Rgt.

When the TA was reconstituted on 1 January 1947, the regiment reformed at Birmingham as the 594th (Warwickshire) Light Anti-Aircraft Regiment, RA. The regiment formed part of 80 AA Bde (the former 54 AA Bde at Sutton Coldfield).

When AA Command was disbanded on 1 March 1955, there was a reduction in the number of AA units, and the 594th LAA Rgt was amalgamated with the 469th (Royal Warwickshire Regiment) HAA Rgt, 580th (5th Bn The Royal Warwickshire Regiment) LAA Regiment (the former 45 AA Bn, from which the cadre of the regiment had been drawn in 1938), and 672 Heavy AA Regiment (Worcestershire), to form the new 442nd LAA Regiment.

594 Rgt formed 'Q' (Warwickshire) Bty at Sheldon in the amalgamated regiment, but in 1961, 442 LAA Rgt was broken up and 'Q' Bty transferred to 268th (Warwickshire) Field Rgt. Then, in 1967, the TA was reorganised again, and 268 Rgt became Regimental HQ and 'P' (68 South Midland) Bty of The Warwickshire Regiment, TA. Finally, the regiment was reduced to cadre strength in 1969 and subsequently disbanded.

== Online sources ==
- British Army units from 1945 on
- British Military History
- Orders of Battle at Patriot Files
- Land Forces of Britain, the Empire and Commonwealth (Regiments.org)
- The Royal Artillery 1939–45
- Graham Watson, The Territorial Army 1947
