= III Anti-Aircraft Corps =

- Formation sign of III Anti-Aircraft Corps. Sign is in Corps colours (red and white) and has crescents from the coat of arms of the GOC Lieutenant-General H. G. Martin.
- Active: 11 November 1940 – 30 September 1942
- Country: United Kingdom
- Branch: British Army
- Type: Anti-Aircraft corps
- Role: Air Defence
- Part of: Anti-Aircraft Command
- Garrison/HQ: Edinburgh
- Engagements: The Blitz; Baedeker Blitz

III Anti-Aircraft Corps was a high-level formation of Britain's Anti-Aircraft Command from 1940 to 1942. It defended Scotland, Northern Ireland and North East England during the Blitz and the middle years of the Second World War.

== Origin ==
AA Command had been created in 1938 to control the Territorial Army's rapidly-expanding anti-aircraft (AA) organisation within Air Defence of Great Britain. On the outbreak of war in September 1939, it commanded seven AA Divisions, each with several AA Brigades, disposed around the United Kingdom. Continued expansion made this organisation unwieldy, so in November 1940 – during the Luftwaffe's nightly Blitz on London and other British cities – five further AA Divisions were organised, and all the divisions grouped under three corps headquarters directly subordinate to AA Command. III AA Corps covered North Eastern England, Scotland and Northern Ireland, and by February 1941 comprised four division-level headquarters and 11 brigades. Its boundaries roughly coincided with No. 13 Group and No. 14 Group of RAF Fighter Command.

== Order of battle ==
III AA Corps had the following organisation from February 1941:

Corps HQ: Edinburgh

General Officer Commanding:

- Lieutenant-General H. G. Martin

=== 3rd AA Division ===
- 36th (Scottish) Anti-Aircraft Brigade (Edinburgh, Forth)
- 51st Light Anti-Aircraft Brigade (North East Scotland)
- 52nd Light Anti-Aircraft Brigade (Sectors)

=== 7th AA Division ===
- 30th (Northumbrian) Anti-Aircraft Brigade (Tyne)
- 43rd Anti-Aircraft Brigade (Tees, Middlesbrough)
- 57th Light Anti-Aircraft Brigade (North East England sector layout)

=== 12th AA Division ===
- 3rd Anti-Aircraft Brigade (Northern Ireland)
- 42nd Anti-Aircraft Brigade (Clyde, Glasgow)
- 63rd Anti-Aircraft Brigade (West of Scotland Gun Defence Areas, sectors)

=== Orkney & Shetland Defence Force (OSDEF) ===
- 58th Anti-Aircraft Brigade
- 59th Anti-Aircraft Brigade

=== Intermediate Ammunition Depots ===
- Kincardine
- Finchale, County Durham

=== Equipment Ammunition Magazines ===
- Invergordon
- Bishopbriggs, near Glasgow
- Renfrew, near Glasgow

== Operations ==
During its short existence, III AA Corps had to deal with the 1940–41 Blitz on industrial towns and cities such as Belfast, Clydebank, Greenock and Newcastle upon Tyne, as well as later raids on Middlesbrough and Sunderland. In August 1942, the 3rd AA Division HQ was sent south to assist in defending the South Coast of England against 'hit and run' attacks by the Luftwaffe.

== Disbandment ==
The AA Corps and Divisional HQs were disbanded in October 1942 and a replaced by a more flexible system of AA Groups. The area covered by III AA Corps became the responsibility of two of the new groups: 6th Anti-Aircraft Group (North East England and Scotland) and 7th Anti-Aircraft Group (Northern Ireland); OSDEF remained directly subordinate to AA Command.

== External sources ==
- British Military History
- Generals of World War II
