= 155th (Mixed) Heavy Anti-Aircraft Regiment, Royal Artillery =

Air defence unit of the British Royal Artillery during WWII

155th (Mixed) HAA Regiment, RA
- Royal Artillery cap badge
- Active: 8 March 1942 – 25 October 1945
- Country: United Kingdom
- Branch: British Army
- Role: Air defence
- Size: Regiment (3–5 batteries)
- Part of: Anti-Aircraft Command; 21st Army Group
- Engagements: Baby Blitz; Operation Diver; Air Defence of Antwerp

155th (Mixed) Heavy Anti-Aircraft Regiment was an air defence unit of Britain's Royal Artillery formed during World War II. Around two-thirds of its personnel were women from the Auxiliary Territorial Service (ATS). After defending the West of Scotland and later London, the regiment was heavily engaged in Operation Diver against V-1 flying bombs, and later was deployed to Antwerp to carry out anti-Diver duties there in the closing stages of the war.

== Organisation ==
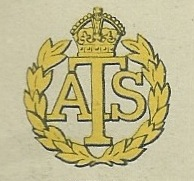
Cap Badge of the Auxiliary Territorial Service

By 1941, after two years of war Anti-Aircraft Command, tasked with defending the UK against air attack, was suffering a manpower shortage. In April its commander-in-chief, Lieutenant-General Sir Frederick 'Tim' Pile, proposed to overcome this by utilising the women of the Auxiliary Territorial Service (ATS). The ATS was by law a non-combatant service, but it was decided that Defence Regulations permitted the employment of women in anti-aircraft (AA) roles other than actually firing the guns. They worked the radar and plotting instruments, range-finders and predictors, ran command posts and communications, and carried out many other duties. With the increasing automation of heavy AA (HAA) guns, including gun-laying, fuze-setting and ammunition loading under remote control from the predictor, the question of who actually fired the gun became blurred as the war progressed. The ATS rank and file, if not always their officers, took to the new role with enthusiasm and 'Mixed' batteries and regiments with the ATS supplying two-thirds of their personnel quickly proved a success.

By early 1942 the training regiments were turning out a regular stream of Mixed HAA batteries, which AA Command formed into regiments to take the place of the all-male units being sent to overseas theatres of war. One such new unit was 155th (Mixed) HAA Regiment. Regimental Headquarters (RHQ) was formed on 8 March 1942 at Dumbarton in Scotland, and over the next four months the following batteries were regimented with it:

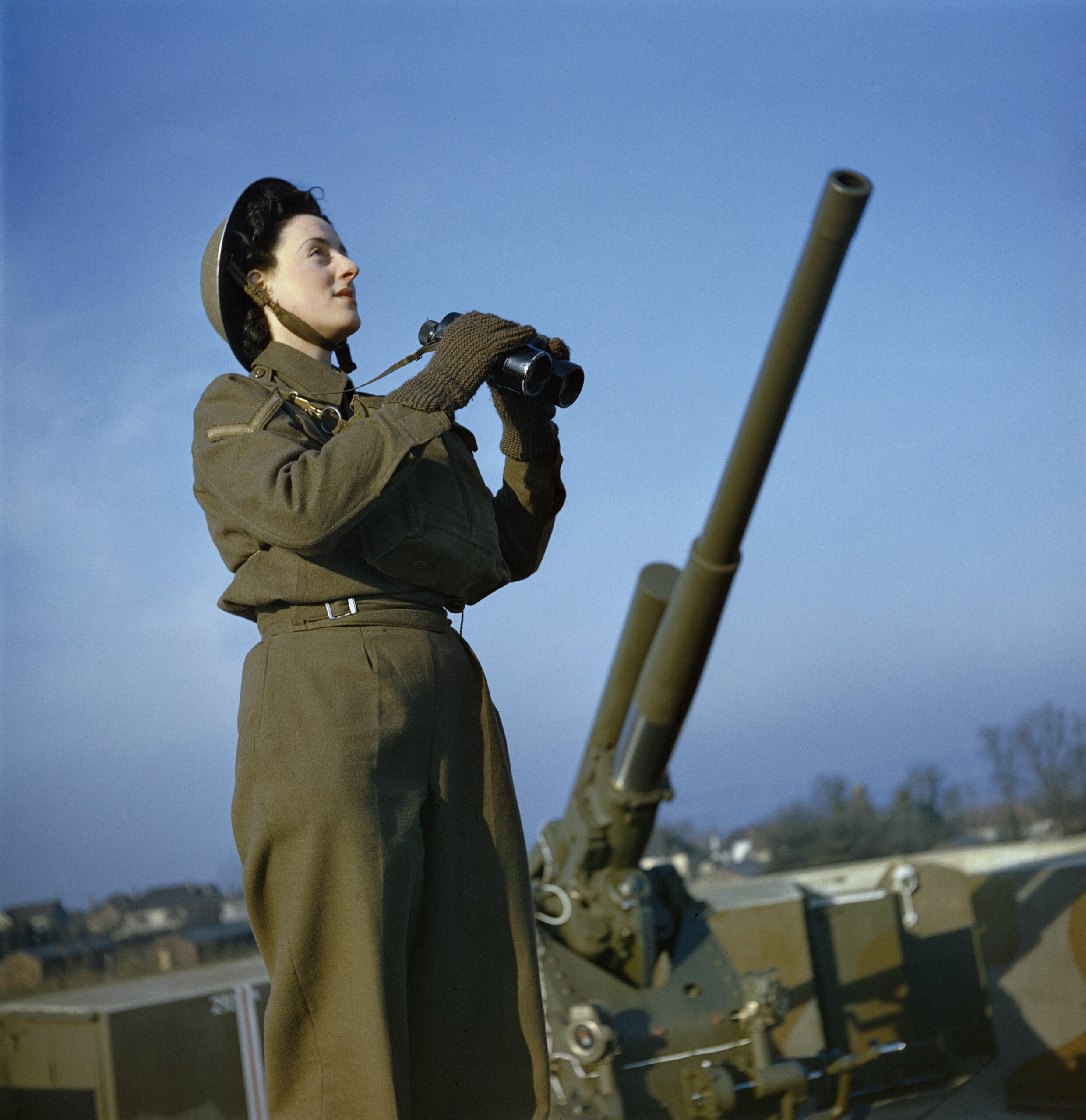
An ATS member of a mixed 3.7-inch HAA gun battery, December 1942.

- 525 (M) HAA Bty, formed on 22 January 1942 by 211th HAA Training Rgt at Oswestry from a cadre of experienced officers and other ranks provided by 101st HAA Rgt, joined on 13 April
- 531 (M) HAA Bty, formed on 5 February by 211th HAA Training Rgt from a cadre provided by 108th HAA Rgt, joined 27 April
- 528 (M) HAA Bty, formed on 29 January by 210th HAA Training Rgt at Oswestry from a cadre supplied by 110th HAA Rgt; this cadre was then transferred on 27 February to 534 (M) HAA Bty, which had been formed on 12 February; the composite battery was designated 528 and joined the regiment on 4 May
- 537 (M) HAA Bty, formed on 19 February by 211th HAA Training Rgt from a cadre supplied by 130th (M) HAA Rgt, joined 11 May
- 554 (M) HAA Bty, formed on 16 April at 206th HAA Training Rgt at Arborfield from a cadre supplied by 114th HAA Rgt, joined 6 July

== Defending Scotland ==
By the end of May 1942 the regiment had joined 57 AA Brigade in 12th AA Division, which was responsible for the air defence of the West of Scotland. The following month 528 (M) HAA Bty was temporarily attached to the neighbouring 63 AA Bde. The regiment transferred within 12th AA Division to the command of 42 AA Bde in August, and became unbrigaded in September.

On 22 August 1942, 554 (M) HAA Bty left the regiment to form the basis of a new 170th (M) HAA Rgt forming in 42 AA Bde at Johnstone, Renfrewshire, in Scotland. 528 (M) HAA Battery also left on 15 September 1942 to join this new regiment. On 26 October 579 (M) HAA Bty joined 155th HAA Rgt to bring it back to a strength of four batteries.

== Defending London ==
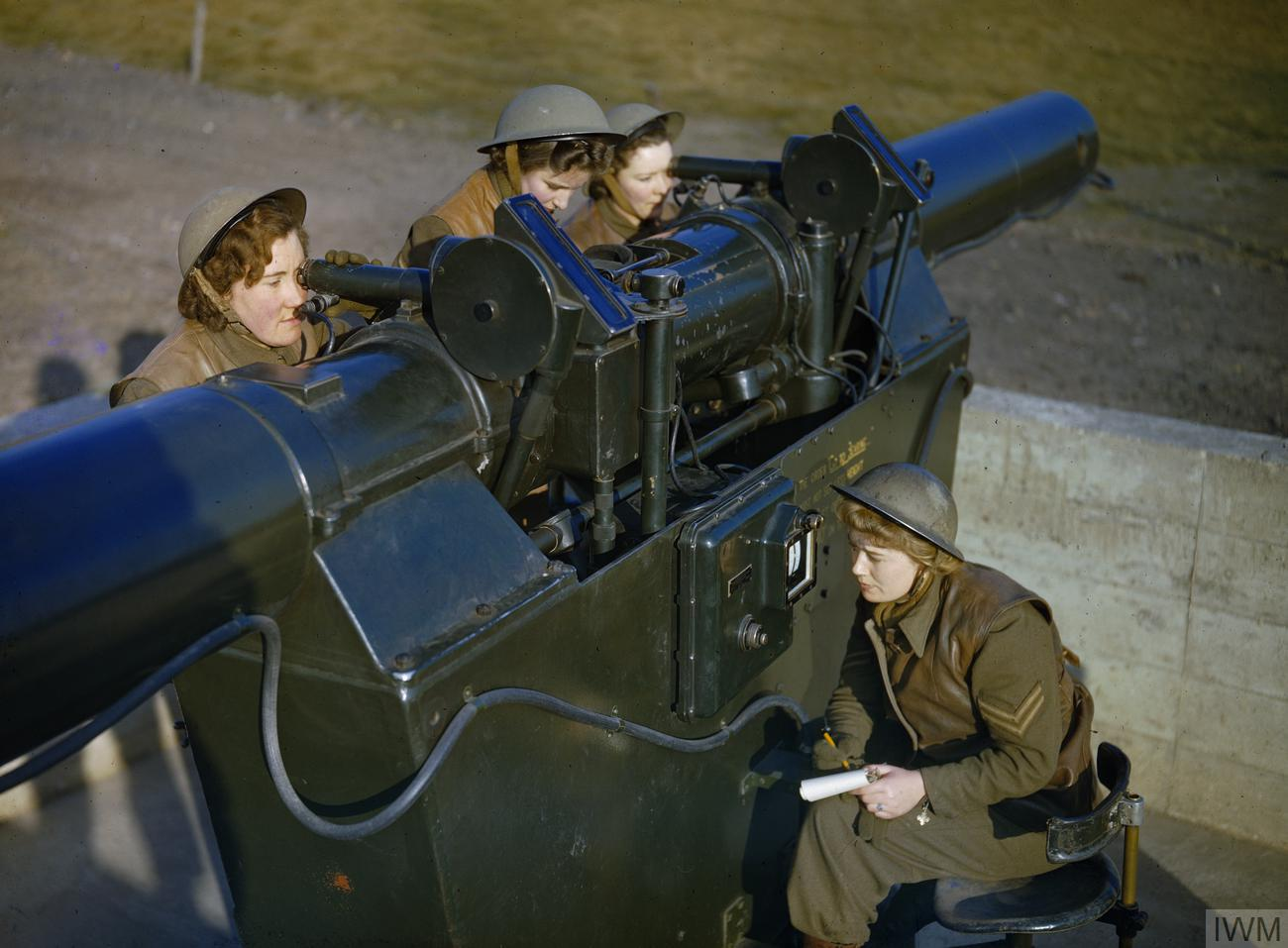
ATS women operating a height and range finder on an HAA gun site, December 1942.

At the beginning of October 1942, AA Command was reorganised, the AA divisions being disbanded and replaced by larger AA Groups. By early November, 155th (M) HAA Rgt came under the command of 48 AA Bde in 1 AA Group covering the London Inner Artillery Zone (IAZ). This remained the regiment's deployment for the next two years.

A few sporadic attacks were made on London during 1943, by conventional bombers at night on 17 January, 3 March and 16 April, by daylight Fighter-bombers on 12 March, and by night again on 7 and 20 October. The Luftwaffe began a new bombing campaign against London in early 1944 (the Baby Blitz), when the city was subjected to 14 raids between 21 January and 18 April. By now the night fighter defences and the London IAZ were well organised and the attackers suffered heavy losses for relatively small results. On 13 February, for example, only six out of 115 aircraft reached London, the rest being driven off. Five raids in the third week of February varying in strength from 100 to 140 aircraft were met by intense AA fire from the Thames Estuary in to the IAZ and fewer than half reached the city; 13 were shot down by AA Command, 15 by the Royal Air Force, and one 'kill' was shared.

== Operation Diver ==
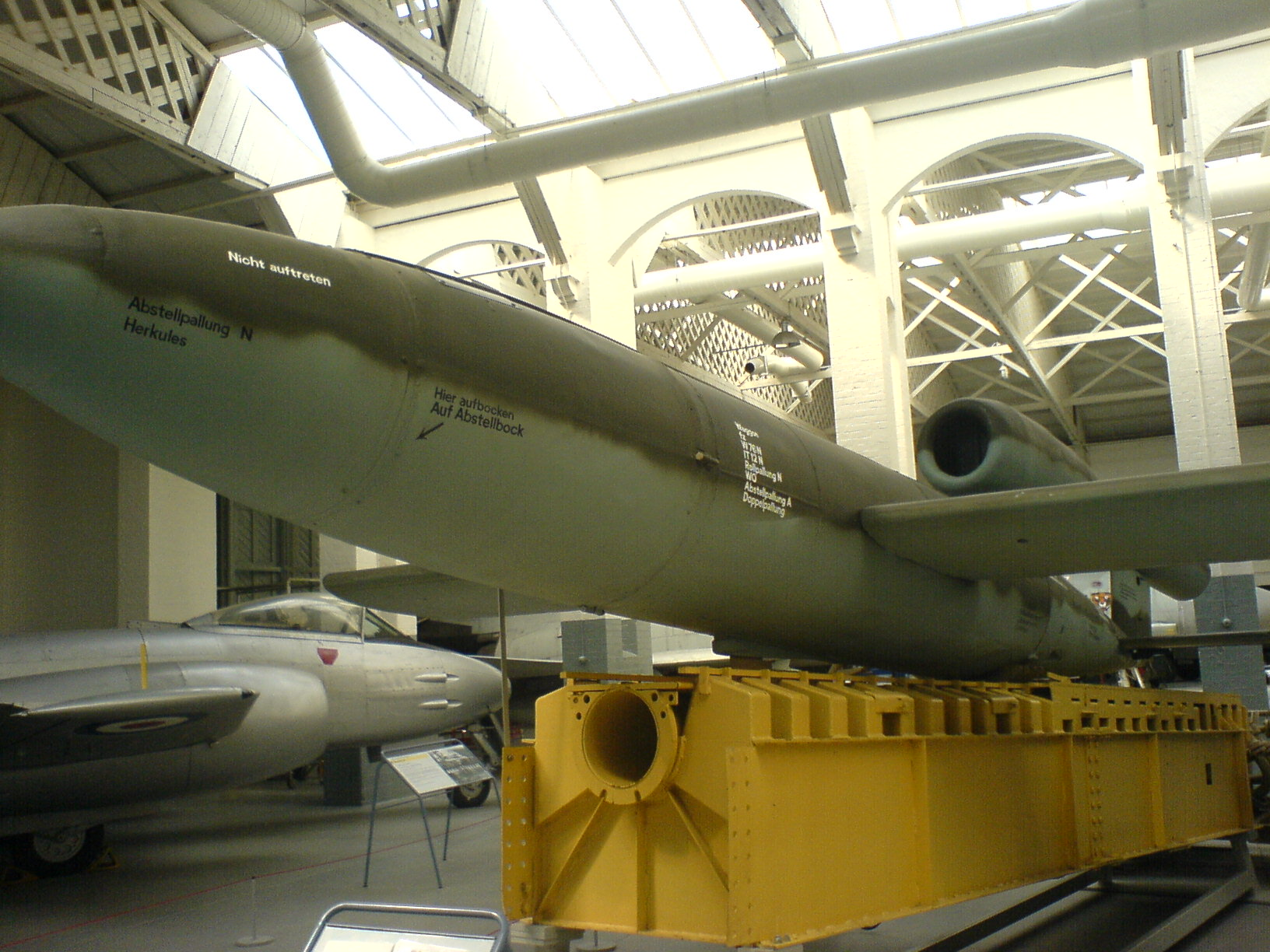
A V-1 and launching ramp section on display at the Imperial War Museum Duxford.

A week after Operation Overlord began on D-Day (6 June), the Germans began launching V-1 flying bombs, codenamed 'Divers', against London. V-1s (known to Londoners as 'Doodlebugs') presented AA Command's biggest challenge since The Blitz of 1940–41. Defences had been planned against this new form of attack (Operation Diver), but the missiles' small size, high speed and awkward height presented a severe problem for AA guns and the initial results were disappointing. After a fortnight AA Command changed its tactics: the HAA gun belt was moved to the coast and interlaced with Light AA guns to hit the missiles out to sea, where the gun-laying radar worked best and where a 'downed' V-1 would cause no damage. This new belt was divided into six brigade sectors under 2 AA Group, 57 AA Bde taking charge of one sector, with 155th (M) HAA Rgt under command from early August. The whole process involved the movement of hundreds of guns and vehicles and thousands of servicemen and women, but a new 8-gun site could be established in 48 hours. After moving the mobile 3.7-inch HAA guns to the coast, these were progressively replaced by the static Mark IIC model, which had power traverse that could more quickly track the fast-moving targets, accompanied by the most sophisticated Radar No 3 Mark V (the SCR-584 radar set) and No 10 Predictor (the all-electric Bell Labs AAA Computer). These were emplaced on temporary 'Pile platforms' named after the C-in-C of AA Command. The introduction of VT Proximity fuzes also increased the 'kill rate'. The guns were constantly in action, but success rates against the 'Divers' steadily improved, until over 50 per cent of incoming missiles were destroyed by gunfire or fighter aircraft. This phase of Operation Diver ended in September after the V-1 launch sites in Northern France had been overrun by 21st Army Group. In early September 155th (M) HAA Rgt returned to 1 AA Group under the command of 37 AA Bde. 1 AA Group had to redeploy facing East to form a 'Diver Box' to intercept V-1s launched by the Luftwaffe from aircraft over the North Sea. In October 1944, 531 Bty was operating 5.25-inch guns – the heaviest guns in service with AA Command – with the higher personnel establishment that these guns required (8 officers, 186 male other ranks, 211 ATS).

== Antwerp 'X' deployment ==
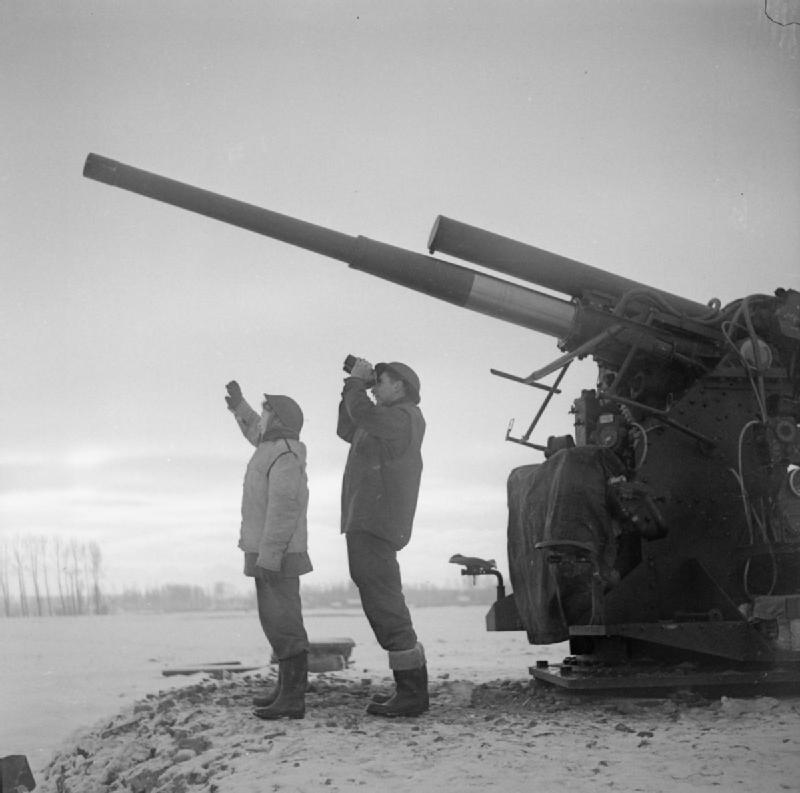
3.7-inch HAA gun of a Mixed HAA battery in Belgium, January 1945.

Once 21st Army Group had captured Brussels and Antwerp, these cities became targets for V-1s launched from within Germany, and anti-Diver or 'X' defences had to be established. AA Command's experience had shown that the power-operated, remotely controlled Mk IIC 3.7-inch gun, with automatic fuze-setting, SCR 584 radar and Predictor No 10 were required to deal effectively with V-1s, but 21st Army Group's mobile HAA units did not have experience with this equipment. In December the first overseas deployment of Mixed HAA units began, and 155th (M) HAA Rgt was one of those selected. The war establishment of an HAA regiment on service overseas was three batteries, so 537 (M) HAA Bty left to become independent on 16 November (it disbanded on 10 December).

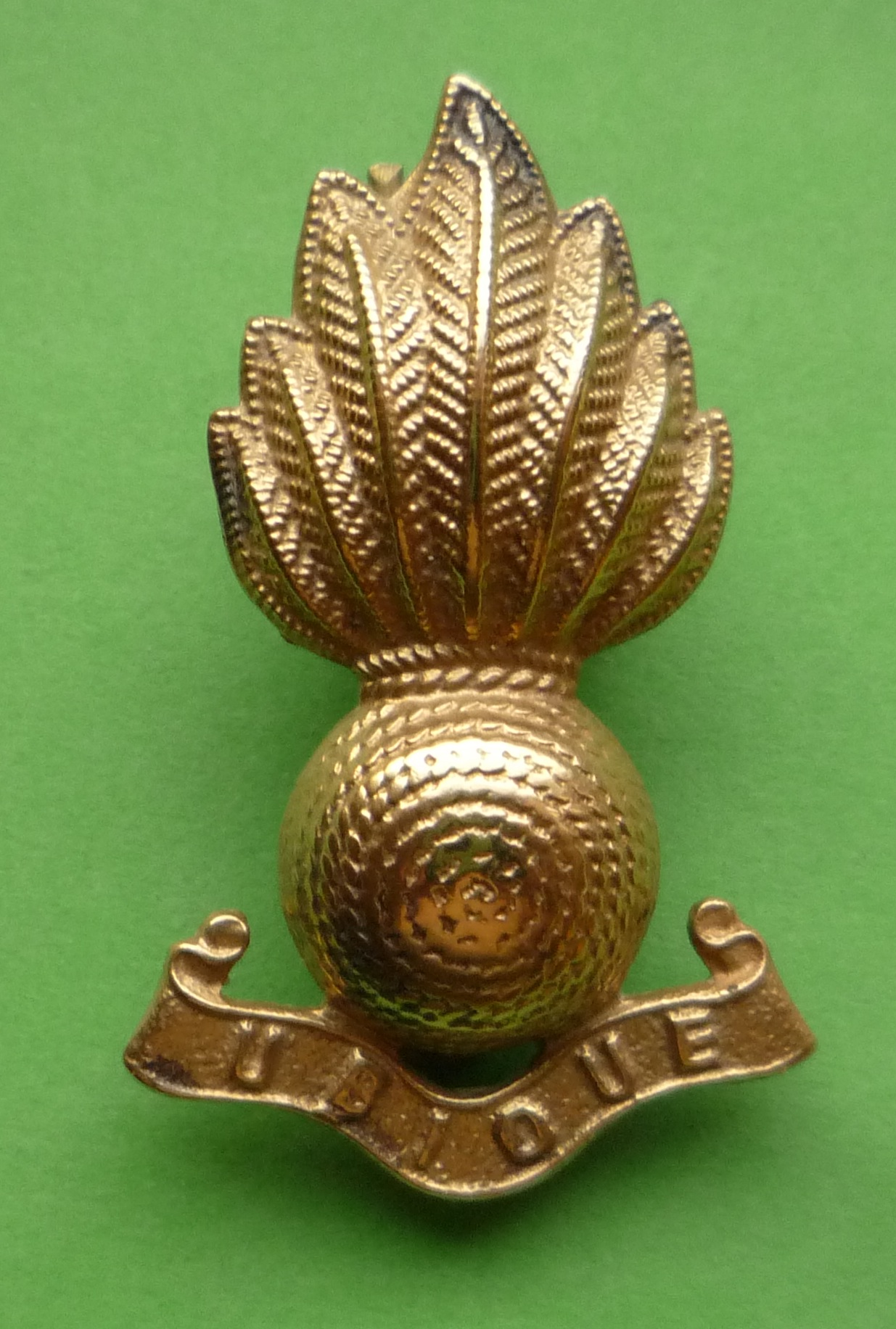
Brass collar badge of the Royal Artillery

The regiment arrived at Antwerp in January 1945, taking over Mk IIC 3.7-inch guns on Pile platforms in bitter weather with inadequate hutting, and were immediately in action against the onslaught of V-1s. The Antwerp 'X' defences under 80 AA Bde involved an outer line of Wireless Observer Units sited 40 miles (64 km) to 50 miles (80 km) in front of the guns to give 8 minutes' warning, then Local Warning (LW) stations positioned half way, equipped with radar to begin plotting individual missiles. Finally there was an inner belt of Observation Posts (OPs), about 20,000 yards (18,000 m) in front of the guns to give visual confirmation that the tracked target was a missile. The LW stations and OPs were operated by teams from the AA regiments. Radar-controlled searchlights were deployed to assist in identification and engagement of missiles at night. The success rate of the X defences had been low at first, but after the arrival of Mk IIC guns and experienced crews from AA Command the results improved considerably, with best results in February and March 1945. The number of missiles launched at Antwerp peaked at 623 a week in February, but dropped rapidly as 21st Army Group continued its advance, and in the last week of action the AA defences destroyed 97.5 per cent of those reaching the defence belt.

The war in Europe ended on VE Day, 8 May 1945. 155th (Mixed) Heavy Anti-Aircraft Regiment, together with 525, 531 and 579 Batteries, was disbanded on 25 October 1945.

== Insignia ==
While the male members of the regiment wore the Royal Artillery's 'gun' cap badge, the women wore the ATS cap badge, but in addition they wore the RA's 'grenade' collar badge as a special badge above the left breast pocket of the tunic. Both sexes wore the white RA lanyard on the right shoulder.
