= 163rd (Mixed) Heavy Anti-Aircraft Regiment, Royal Artillery =

163rd (Mixed) HAA Regiment, RA 101 (Mixed) HAA Regiment, RA
- Royal Artillery cap badge
- Active: 28 June 1942 – 10 November 1948
- Country: United Kingdom
- Branch: British Army
- Role: Air defence
- Size: Regiment (4 batteries)
- Part of: Anti-Aircraft Command
- Engagements: Air defence of the UK

163rd (Mixed) Heavy Anti-Aircraft Regiment was an air defence unit of Britain's Royal Artillery formed during World War II. Around two-thirds of its personnel were women from the Auxiliary Territorial Service (ATS). The regiment defended London, operating the heaviest guns serving with Anti-Aircraft Command.

== Organisation ==
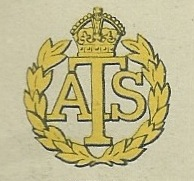
Cap Badge of the Auxiliary Territorial Service

By 1941, after two years of war Anti-Aircraft Command, tasked with defending the UK against air attack, was suffering a manpower shortage. In April its commander-in-chief, Lieutenant-General Sir Frederick 'Tim' Pile, proposed to overcome this by utilising the women of the Auxiliary Territorial Service (ATS). The ATS was by law a non-combatant service, but it was decided that Defence Regulations permitted the employment of women in anti-aircraft (AA) roles other than actually firing the guns. They worked the radar and plotting instruments, range-finders and predictors, ran command posts and communications, and carried out many other duties. With the increasing automation of heavy AA (HAA) guns, including gun-laying, fuze-setting and ammunition loading under remote control from the predictor, the question of who actually fired the gun became blurred as the war progressed. The ATS rank and file, if not always their officers, took to the new role with enthusiasm and 'Mixed' batteries and regiments with the ATS supplying two-thirds of their personnel quickly proved a success.

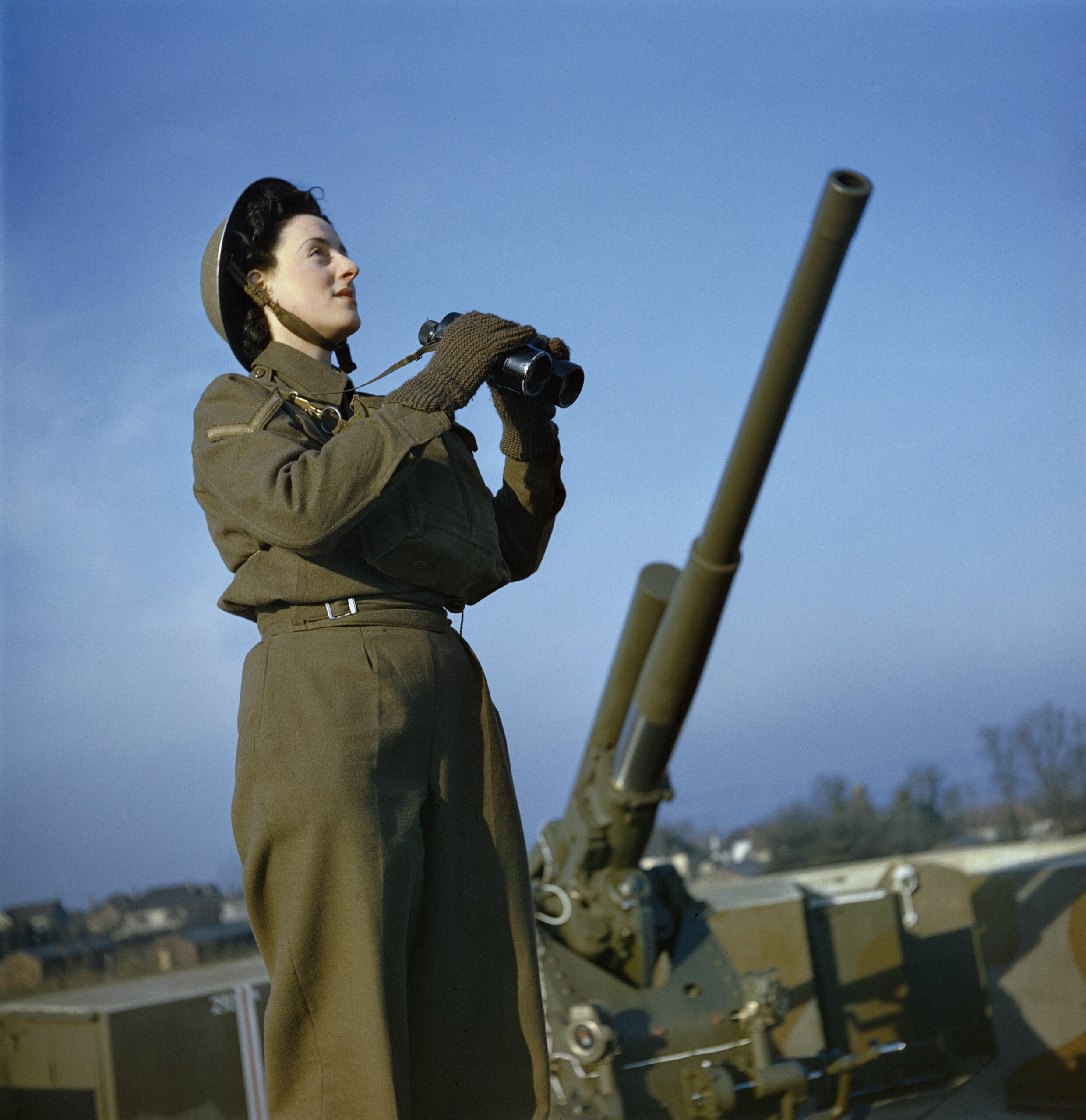
An ATS member of a mixed 3.7-inch HAA gun battery, December 1942.

By 1942 the training regiments were turning out a regular stream of Mixed HAA batteries, which AA Command formed into regiments to take the place of the all-male units being sent to overseas theatres of war. One such new unit was 163rd (Mixed) HAA Regiment. Regimental Headquarters (RHQ) was formed on 28 June 1942 at Wimbledon in South London and 553 (M) Bty was regimented with it. This battery had been intended for 132nd (M) HAA Rgt, but its formation had been delayed because of a shortage of ATS personnel. It had finally been formed on 16 April by 205th HAA Training Rgt at Arborfield from a cadre provided by 105th HAA Rgt. Two other batteries joined the regiment at this time: 350 Bty from 105th HAA Rgt and 538 (M) Bty from 141st (M) HAA Rgt. 565 (M) Bty joined the regiment on 14 September 1942; this had been formed on 10 June at 24th HAA Training Rgt, Blackdown Camp, from a cadre provided by 132nd HAA Rgt.

== Defending London ==
The new regiment was assigned to 48th Anti-Aircraft Brigade in 1st Anti-Aircraft Division (later 1 AA Group) defending the London Inner Artillery Zone (IAZ), and apart from a few weeks remained with it throughout its service.

=== Baby Blitz ===
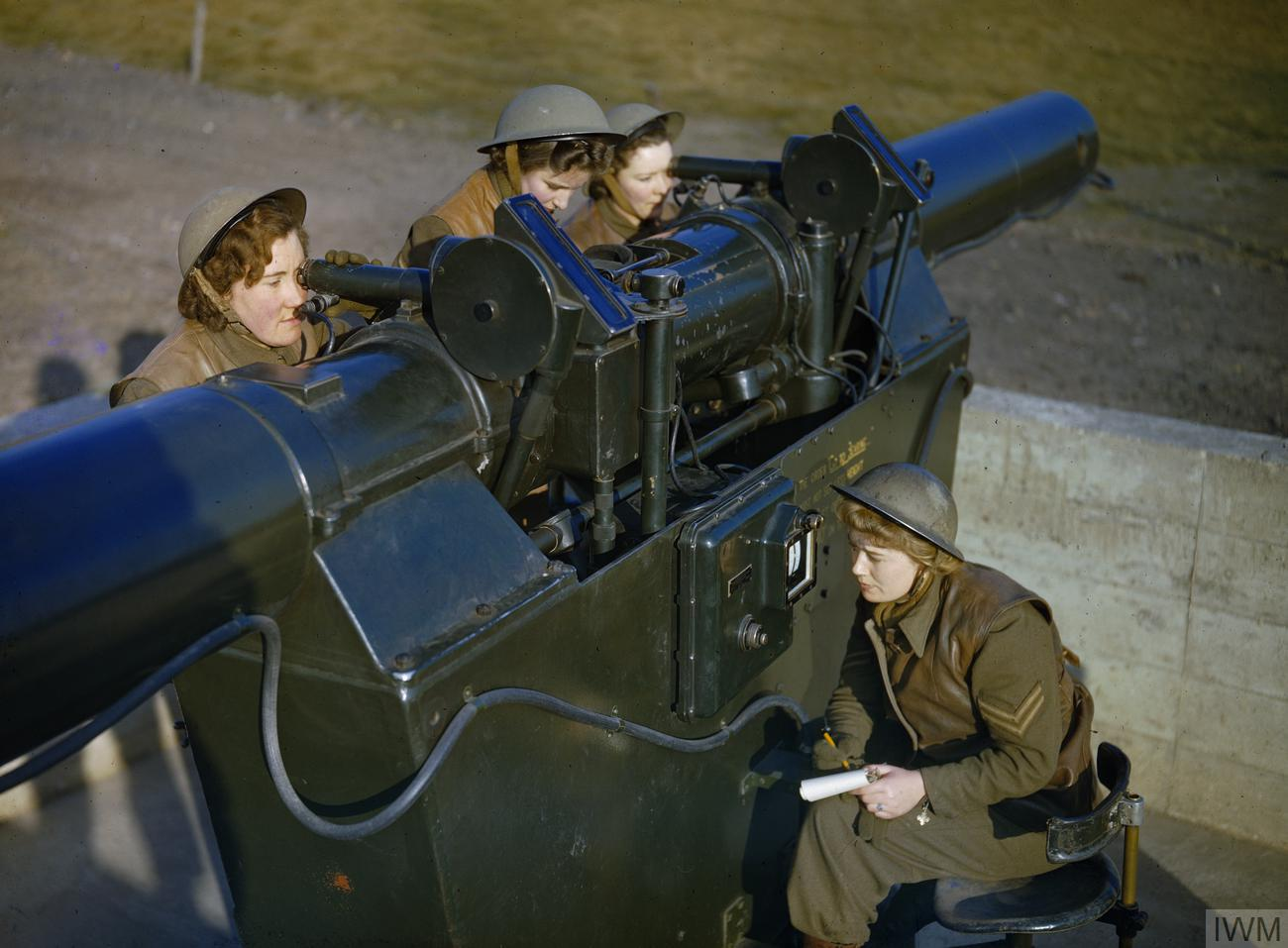
ATS women operating a height and range finder on an HAA gun site, December 1942.

The Luftwaffe carried out few bombing raids on London during 1942–43, preferring to concentrate on softer targets such as provincial cities (the Baedeker Blitz) or on 'hit and run' attacks by Fighter-bombers against coastal targets. However, in January 1944 it resumed night raids on London, which became known as the 'Baby Blitz'. These raids employed new faster bombers with sophisticated 'pathfinder' techniques and radar jamming. For example, on the night of 21 January 200 hostile aircraft were plotted approaching the South Coast in two waves, which intermingled with returning aircraft of RAF Bomber Command. This caused problems of identification and restrictions on fire, but the guns of 2 AA Group and then 1 AA Group engaged as the raiders approached London. Only one-fifth of the raiders reached the city, the remainder turning away to bomb open country. AA guns brought down eight aircraft. At the end of January London Docks received a 130-strong raid dropping flares and incendiaries as they had in the London Blitz of 1940–41: about one-third reached their target and five were shot down. February began with a 75-strong raid, of which only 12 reached the IAZ and four were shot down. On 13 February only six out of 115 bombers reached London. The climax came with five raids in the week 18–25 February varying from 100 to 140 in strength. These met intense AA fire from the Thames Estuary onwards and fewer than half made it to central London: the AA score was 13 shot down while the night fighters added 15. Facing these casualty rates, the Luftwaffe switched to targets away from London until 24 March, when a 100-strong raid on London lost four aircraft, and finally on 18 April a raid of 125 aircraft lost 14 shot down and only 30 reached the IAZ. Although much damage was caused in London, the rising efficiency of the HAA guns and radar made the enemy's losses unsustainable.

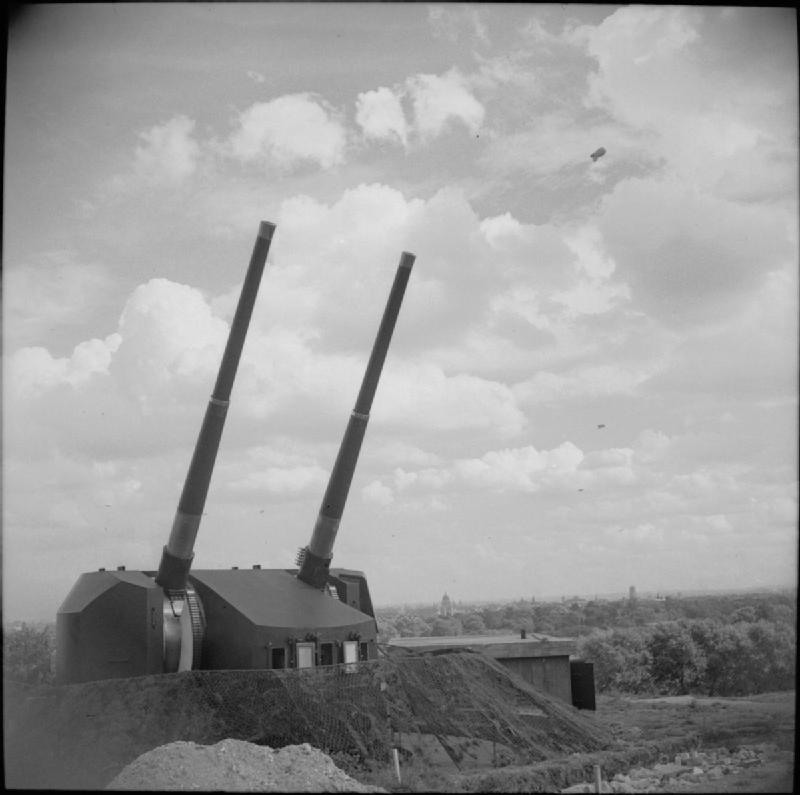
Naval twin 5.25-inch HAA turret mounted at Primrose Hill, London.

By the autumn of 1944, the regiment was serving on 5.25-inch guns – the heaviest guns in service with AA Command – with 350 Bty operating the powered twin ex-naval turrets covering London. This required a higher personnel establishment of 8 officers, 186 male other ranks and 211 ATS per 5.25-inch battery, 12 officers, 147 male other ranks, 293 ATS for the turrets.

=== Operation Diver ===
Soon after the Allied invasion of Normandy began on D-Day, V-1 flying bombs, codenamed 'Divers', began to be launched against London from Northern France. V-1s (known to Londoners as 'Doodlebugs') presented AA Command's biggest challenge since the Blitz. Defences had been planned against this new form of attack (Operation Diver), but it presented a severe problem for AA guns, and after two weeks' experience AA Command carried out a major reorganisation, stripping guns from the London IAZ and other parts of the UK and repositioning them along the South Coast to target V-1s coming in over the English Channel, where a 'downed' V-1 would cause no damage. This meant that the remaining HAA guns around the IAZ, including the fixed 5.25-inch guns, were silenced, to the rage of Londoners, who were unaware of the tactics being employed. As the launching sites were overrun by 21st Army Group, the Luftwaffe switched to air-launching V-1s over the North Sea, so 1 AA Group had to redeploy again to the east of London. This reorganisation entailed 163rd (M) HAA Rgt transferring within 1 AA Group to come under the command of 26th (London) AA Bde in November–December 1944. It returned to 48th AA Bde within weeks.

By now, AA Command was being forced to release personnel, both male and ATS, for service with 21st Army Group fighting in North West Europe, and a large number of units had to be disbanded. 565 (M) Battery began disbanding on 18 September, and completed the process by 16 October. It was replaced on 7 February 1945 when 505 (M) Bty joined from 157th HAA Rgt, but by then the war in Europe was coming to an end. 553 (M) Battery disbanded at Southend-on-Sea on 31 March 1945.

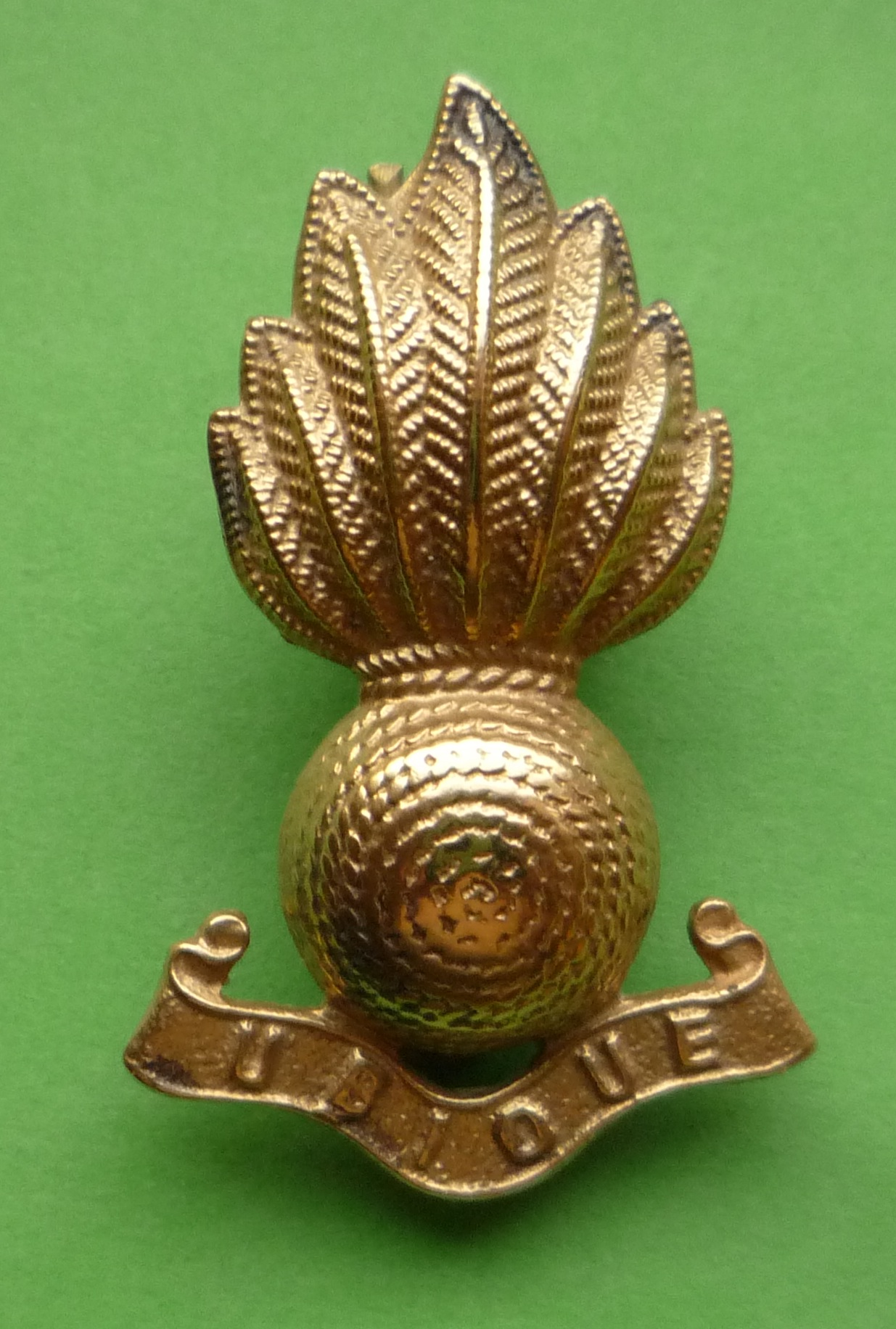
Brass collar badge of the Royal Artillery

== Postwar ==
163rd (M) HAA Regiment remained with 48 AA Bde in 1 AA Group after the war had ended. When the RA was reorganised on 1 April 1947, 163rd (M) HAA Rgt was redesignated 101 (M) HAA Regiment in the postwar Regular Army, (taking the number of a pre-war Territorial Army unit in Scotland that had been redesignated 501 HAA Rgt). 350, 505 and 538 Batteries were redesignated 241, 296 and 323 (M) Btys. It was one of only three Mixed regiments in the postwar Regular RA. The regiment formed part of 15 AA Bde – the Regular Army element of the old 48 AA Bde – in 1 AA Group of AA Command.

However, the new regiment did not last very long under postwar cuts. It was reduced to a cadre in London on 30 June 1948, 323 Bty was disbanded on 10 October, and RHQ and the other two batteries were placed in suspended animation on 10 November, completing the process by the end of the month.

== Insignia ==
While the male members of the regiment wore the Royal Artillery's 'gun' cap badge, the women wore the ATS cap badge, but in addition they wore the RA's 'grenade' collar badge as a special badge above the left breast pocket of the tunic. Both sexes wore the white RA lanyard on the right shoulder.
