= 101st Heavy Anti-Aircraft Regiment, Royal Artillery =

WW2 British Territorial Army unit

101st HAA Regiment, RA 501st HAA Regiment, RA
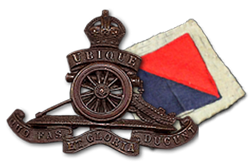
- Royal Artillery cap badge and AA patch
- Active: 1939–1955
- Country: United Kingdom
- Branch: Territorial Army
- Type: Heavy Anti-Aircraft Regiment
- Role: Air Defence; Ground support
- Part of: 3rd AA Division; Orkney & Shetland Defence Force; XXXIII Indian Corps
- Garrison/HQ: Inverness (1939); Aberdeen (1947)
- Engagements: Defence of Scapa Flow; Burma Campaign 1944–45; Operation Capital

The 101st Heavy Anti-Aircraft Regiment, Royal Artillery (101st HAA Rgt) was an air defence unit of Britain's Territorial Army raised in northern Scotland just before World War II. After defending the naval base of Scapa Flow against air attack in the early part of the war, the regiment went to India and later took part in the Burma Campaign in the anti-aircraft role and with heavy howitzers in support of ground forces, even on occasion fighting as infantry. It was reformed in the post-war TA (as 501st HAA Rgt) and continued until the abolition of Anti-Aircraft Command in 1955.

== Origin ==
The regiment was formed in August 1939 from two previously independent anti-aircraft (AA) batteries of the Royal Artillery (RA): 226th (Caithness and Orkney) AA Bty and 297th (Inverness) AA Bty. The regimental headquarters (RHQ) was at Inverness. (AA Regiments and Batteries equipped with 3.7-inch and larger guns were redesignated Heavy AA (HAA) on 1 June 1940 to distinguish them from the new Light AA (LAA) units that were being formed).

=== 226th (Caithness and Orkney) HAA Bty ===
All the Territorial Army (TA) units recruited in the Orkney Islands had been disbanded during World War I, but with the deteriorating international situation in 1937 the part-time TA was expanded, and the first new unit in the Orkneys was part of an AA battery, with the remainder recruited from Caithness on the mainland of Scotland. The first officer commanding (OC) of 226th (Caithness and Orkney) AA Bty (appointed 1 February 1938) was Brevet Colonel G.D.K. Murray, OBE, MC, TD, formerly commanding officer (CO) of 4th/5th Battalion, Seaforth Highlanders, (although in his new role he only received the rank and allowances of a Major). The battery had its headquarters (HQ) at Kirkwall on Orkney.

=== 297th (Inverness) HAA Bty ===
At the beginning of 1939, 297th (Inverness) Battery, based at Margaret Street in Inverness, was part of 75th (Highland) Field Regiment; prior to 1920 it had been the Inverness-shire Royal Horse Artillery, first formed in 1908. It was commanded by Brevet Lieutenant-Colonel J.A. Mackintosh. By May 1939, it was being converted into a AA battery.

== Mobilisation and Phoney War ==
The TA's AA units were mobilised on 23 September 1938 during the Munich Crisis, with units manning their emergency positions within 24 hours, even though many did not yet have their full complement of men or equipment. The emergency lasted three weeks, and they were stood down on 13 October. In February 1939, the existing AA defences came under the control of a new Anti-Aircraft Command. In June, as the international situation worsened, a partial mobilisation of the TA was begun in a process known as 'couverture', whereby each AA unit did a month's tour of duty in rotation to man selected AA gun and searchlight positions. On 24 August, ahead of the declaration of war, AA Command was fully mobilised at its war stations. In the case of 226th (Caithness and Orkney) Bty, this was at the vital naval base of Scapa Flow, which consists of an anchorage virtually surrounded by the Orkney Islands. On the outbreak of war, the battery's eight guns were the base's only land-based AA defence, though the Royal Navy estimated that at least 24 were required to protect the unarmed tankers and storeships, and the shore facilities. 101st HAA Regiment, under the command of Bt-Col G.D.K. Murray, formed part of 36th (Scottish) Anti-Aircraft Brigade in 3 AA Division.

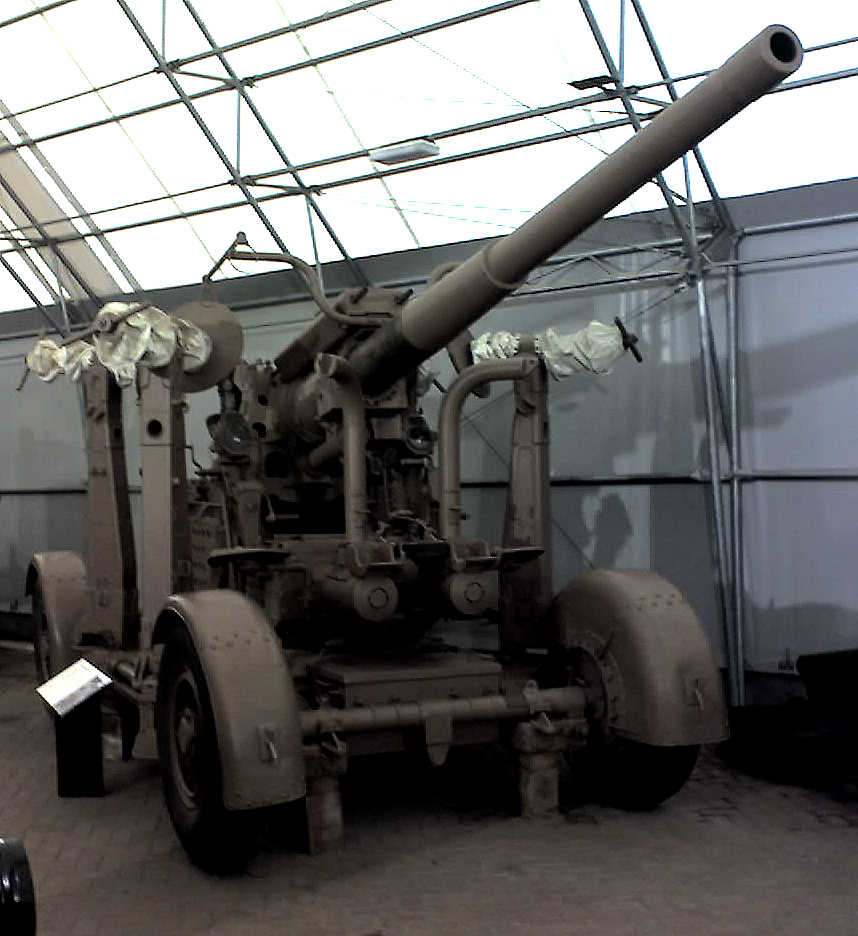
3.7-inch HAA gun preserved at Fort Nelson, Hampshire.

Scottish naval bases received the initial attacks by the German Luftwaffe: first Rosyth on the Firth of Forth on 16 October, then Scapa Flow the following day, when 14 hostile aircraft in three waves attacked the warships in the anchorage. Although there was as yet no early-warning radar for Scapa, 226 HAA Bty was able to engage the raiders, shooting down one, which crashed on the island of Hoy, although the decommissioned former Fleet flagship HMS Iron Duke (being used as an AA platform) was hit and had to be beached. These attacks prompted calls for stronger AA defences at Scottish bases and 3 AA Division was strongly reinforced with 3.7-inch and 4.5-inch HAA guns, searchlights, and a few LAA guns. Among the reinforcements was the first new HAA battery formed in the Royal Artillery after the outbreak of war, 317 Bty of 101st HAA Rgt, formed at Inverness. But the problems at Scapa were formidable: the anchorage is so large that parts were beyond the range of HAA guns, and the guns had to be laboriously emplaced on rugged islands that were only accessible by boat. The next attack, on 16 March 1940, caught these increased defences only half prepared. About 15 Junkers Ju 88 bombers approached at low level at dusk, half attacking the warships and the rest attacking the airfield. Forty-four HAA guns engaged, but the predictors were defeated by the bombers' erratic courses amidst the gun-flashes and low light, and none were shot down, while the Navy suffered further losses.

== Home Defence ==
By the time the Phoney War ended and the Battle of Britain began in July 1940, the Orkney and Shetland Defence Force (OSDEF) had 88 HAA guns at Scapa Flow and 12 in Shetland, under 58 and 59 AA Brigades. While 226 HAA Bty remained on Orkney operating under RHQ of 81st HAA Rgt, RHQ of 101st HAA Rgt with 297 and 317 HAA Btys was in Shetland. Together with 60 LAA Bty (of 19th LAA Rgt) and a S/L Bty, the regiment was the sole AA Defence of Shetland.

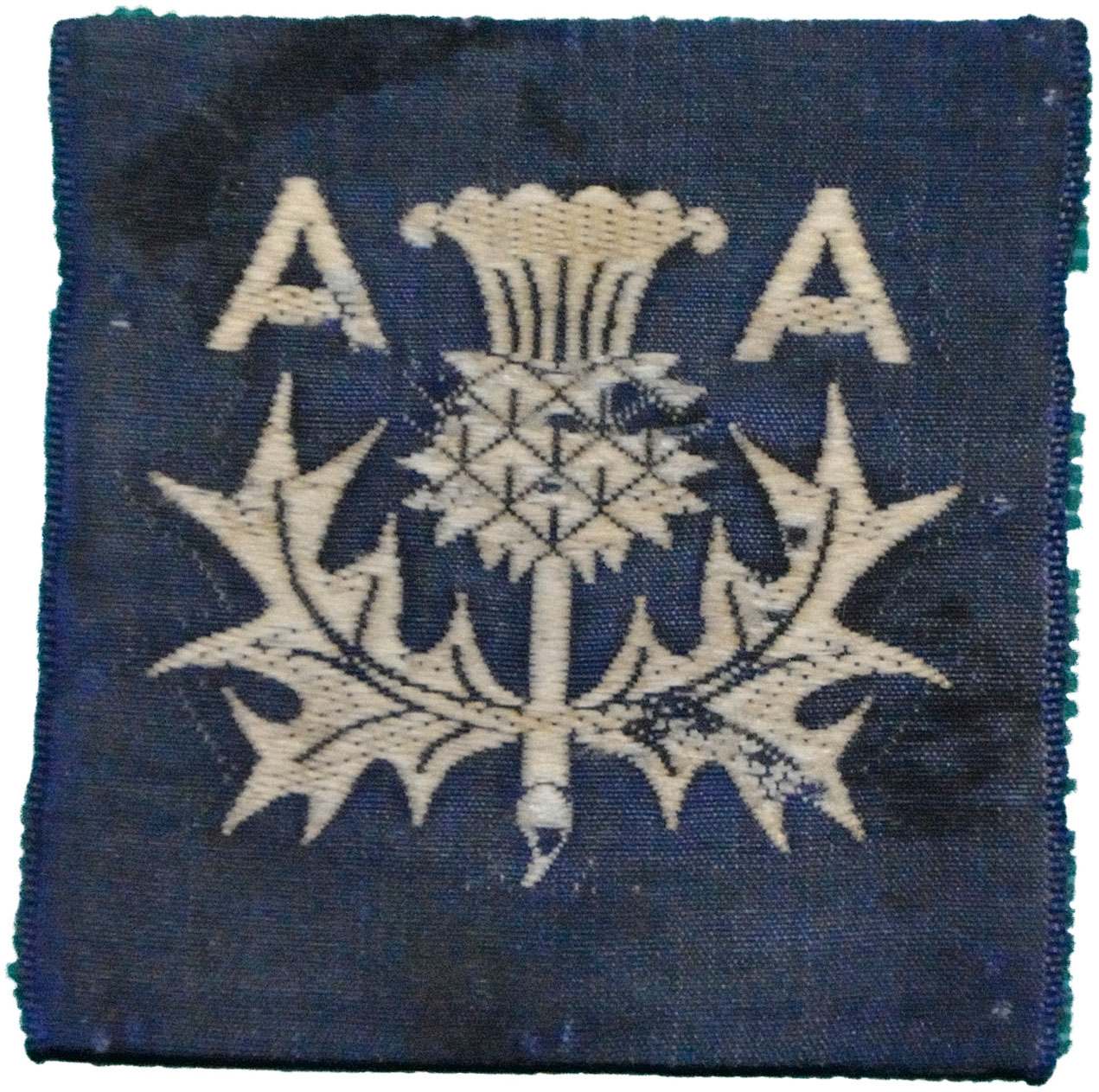
3 AA Divisional sign

The regiment remained in OSDEF, latterly with 136 Z Battery (equipped with rocket projectors) under its command, until June 1941, when it crossed back to North Eastern mainland Scotland, where it joined 51 AA Bde in 3 AA Division.

The regiment sent a cadre to 210th Training Regiment at Oswestry to provide the basis for a new 389 Bty; this was formed on 14 November 1940 and later joined 111th HAA Rgt. On 18 June 1941 317 HAA Bty left to join 71st (Forth) HAA Rgt and was replaced by 379 HAA Bty transferred from 108th HAA Rgt in 51 AA Bde. (Note: Some normally reliable sources state that 397 HAA Bty was part of 101st HAA Rgt in the Far East: this is contradicted by the authoritative War Office orders of battle and the RA regimental history. It was 379 HAA Bty that joined the regiment in Autumn 1941 and remained with it for the rest of the war, while 397 HAA Bty was in 122nd HAA Rgt.)

In the summer, 101st HAA Rgt was joined by a fourth battery, the newly raised 427 HAA Bty. This battery had been formed at 211th HAA Training Rgt, Oswestry, on 24 April 1941 from a cadre supplied by 54th (City of London) HAA Rgt, then joined 64th (Northumbrian) HAA Rgt on 22 July before transferring on to 101st HAA Rgt on 6 August. 101st HAA Rgt provided another cadre for 481 (Mixed) Bty formed at 210th HAA Training Rgt on 18 September 1941, which joined 137th (Mixed) HAA Rgt ('Mixed' units were those into which women from the Auxiliary Territorial Service were integrated.) The regiment supplied a further cadre to 211th Training Rgt for 525 (M) HAA Bty formed on 22 January 1942 for 155th (M) HAA Rgt.

In June 1942, RHQ moved to South East England to join 56 AA Bde in 6 AA Division, with 226, 379 and 427 HAA Btys, while 297 HAA Bty remained in Scotland, temporarily attached to 52 AA Bde in 3 AA Division. On 10 July, 427 HAA Bty left the regiment and joined 147th HAA Rgt, reducing 101st to the three-battery establishment for overseas service. Shortly afterwards, 101st HAA Rgt moved to 35 AA Bde in 5 AA Division covering central Southern England, while 297 HAA Bty was attached to 3 AA Bde in Northern Ireland. Finally, in September, the regiment joined 26 (London) AA Bde in 1 AA Division.

== India ==
These rapid moves and the reduction to a three-battery establishment were characteristic for AA units being prepared for overseas service, when they were loaned back to AA Command between training camps. In January 1943, 101st HAA Regiment left AA Command and came under direct War Office Control, with 226, 297, 379 HAA Btys and its own 101 HAA Workshop Section, Royal Electrical and Mechanical Engineers (REME), under command. It embarked for India and left by mid March.

101sth HAA Regiment landed at Bombay at the beginning of July 1943 and moved to Avadi, where it came under the command of 3 Indian AA Bde. 226 and 297 HAA Batteries were mobile, while 379 Bty manned static guns. 297 HAA Battery was soon detached to Madras, but returned on 10 August in time for the regiment to move back to the Bombay area. From 15 October 1943 to 27 January 1944, the regiment came under the command of 1 Royal Marines AA Bde, and from 16 April under 9 AA Bde.

== Burma ==
In September, it moved up to the front, arriving in the Imphal area on 27 September, where it joined XXXIII Indian Corps in time for Operation Capital. This operation was designed to throw the Japanese off the Manipur heights and establish bases on the Chindwin River. As the force struggled forward through the Monsoon, the corps' AA gunners followed closely behind, moving east from Imphal to Tamu, and down the Kabaw Valley to meet 5th Indian Division at Kalemyo at the end of November.

With the almost total elimination of the Japanese air force in the theatre, Fourteenth Army increasingly used its 3.7-inch HAA guns as medium artillery against ground targets. As 11th East African Division forced its way through the Myittha Gorge to Kalewa, a troop of 101st HAA Rgt was directed by air observation post (AOP) aircraft to fire at the town. This was at 19,400 yards (17,700 m), extreme range for a 3.7-inch gun, but the AOP pilot observed the first shot land exactly in the confluence of the Myittha and Chindwin rivers and was quickly able to correct the fire onto the nearby track junction. Throughout the following nights, the guns fired harassing fire (HF) tasks against this bottleneck, causing severe disruption to the Japanese movements. Kalewa fell on 2 December.

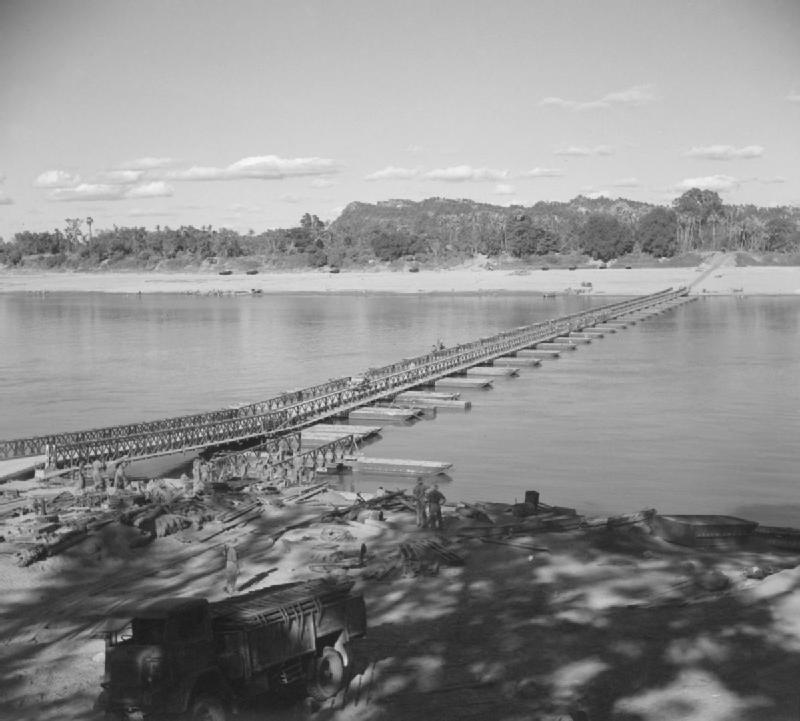
The Bailey Bridge across the Chindwin at Kalewa

While XXXIII Corps bridged the Chindwin at Kalewa, 101st HAA Rgt provided AA protection for the bridgehead. Although Japanese air attacks had been slight, now they made determined efforts to destroy the 1,150 feet (350 m) Bailey bridge, but the HAA and LAA guns fired intense concentrations that broke up the attacks and shot down several aircraft; the bridge remained intact.

In December, 'A' Troop of 226 HAA Bty took over four 7.2-inch howitzers. Moving these heavy guns through the jungle and Paddy fields into firing positions took enormous labour, and often required extra recovery vehicles and bulldozers. Normally, the howitzers went forward at first light to join the infantry, who would identify the target, usually a bunker. This would be engaged over open sights, sometimes after an air strike or field guns had blown away any camouflage to reveal the target. There was pressure to achieve early hits and to couple the gun up to its tractor and withdraw before the Japanese retaliated with mortar fire.

That month, XXXIII Corps launched its main drive from Kalewa towards Mandalay down two routes. The Corps Commander Royal Artillery (CCRA) decentralised control over 101st HAA Rgt, so that 226th Bty accompanied 2nd Division on the left, heading through the jungle for Shwebo, while 297 Bty went with 20th Indian Division on the right down the Chindwin towards Monywa. 2nd Division made good progress to Shwebo in January 1945, with 226 HAA Bty providing route protection and cover for airstrips and field gun positions. Japanese aircraft raided the airfields in greater numbers than had been seen for some time. 20th Indian Division had rougher going along the river valley, and then a stiff six-day battle to take Monywa.

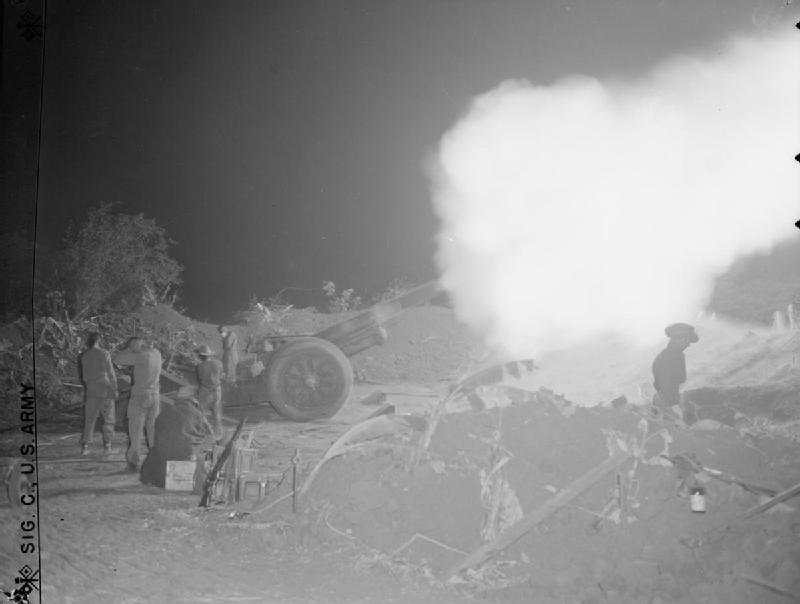
7.2-inch howitzer in action at night in Burma, February 1945.

The CCRA then organised a strong artillery group to support the two divisions in their assault crossing of the 2 miles (3.2 km) wide Irrawaddy River, with 101st HAA Rgt operating both its 16 x 3.7-inch and 4 x 7.2-inch equipment. The long-range 3.7s were used for a long programme of counter-battery (CB), Interdiction and HF tasks, with half the guns capable of immediate reversion to the AA role if enemy aircraft appeared. One 3.7-inch HAA gun, detached to 16th Field Rgt with 2nd Division, could just reach Mandalay. 20th Indian Division began its crossing on 12 February 1945, supported by a corps fire programme including 'bombard' tasks from 3- to 7-inch guns at 18,400 yards (16,800 m) using AA Fuzes. It took 20th Indian Division two weeks to establish a firm bridgehead and beat off counter-attacks, then 2nd Division began its assault upstream, supported by the Corps artillery in similar fashion.

By the first week in March, XXXIII Corps' divisions were closing in to capture Mandalay from several directions, and 101st HAA Rgt's batteries were once more decentralised to the divisions, moving and fighting with the infantry, often under heavy shellfire. 19th Indian Division reached the outskirts of the city on 7 March and began a siege of Fort Dufferin. After that citadel fell on 20 March, 2nd and 20th Indian Divisions began to clear the city.

Now that the Irrawaddy was crossed and Mandalay captured, the country was more open, and Fourteenth Army could drive towards Rangoon. 101st HAA Regiment remained as Corps HAA regiment with XXXIII Corps, used mainly in the ground role, though 297 and 379 HAA Btys were posted to defend Magwe airfield when it fell to 19th Indian Division on 19 April (XXXIII Corps was depending on supply by air). During the advance on Prome, gunners of 101st HAA Rgt fought for a while as infantry, guarding the gap between XXXIII and IV Corps. They sent out fighting patrols and fought several actions with Japanese troops trying to escape eastwards. The regiment was then concentrated at Allanmyo for rest before returning to ground and air defence artillery tasks.

By 20 May, 101st HAA Rgt was supporting 268th Indian Infantry Brigade in its advance along the east bank of the Irrawaddy. The weather broke and made all movement difficult, but opposition was light, and the force established a cordon along the river to catch the retreating Japanese, who made determined attempts to break through until the fighting ended on 30 May. June was spent clearing up pockets of Japanese in the Irrawaddy area.

In June 1945, XXXIII Indian Corps was disbanded (its HQ became the basis for the new Twelfth Army) and the AA organisation in Burma was regrouped. By the end of the month, 101st HAA Rgt was at Meiktila under 24 AA Bde, and 379 HAA Bty disbanded on 14 July 1945.

After the Japanese surrender on 15 August, the regiment was at Rangoon with just its original batteries (226 and 297), where it was placed in suspended animation between 1 September and 1 December 1945.

== Postwar ==
When the TA was reconstituted on 1 January 1947, the regiment was reformed as 501 (Mobile) Heavy Anti-Aircraft Regiment, now based at Fairfield Camp, Aberdeen. It formed part of 78 AA Bde (the former 52 AA Bde at Perth). (Note: On 1 April 1947 a new 101st HAA Rgt was formed in the Regular Army by the redesignation of the war-formed 163rd (M) HAA Rgt, but it only had a short existence.)

In March 1955, AA Command was abolished, and there were wholesale disbandments and amalgamations among its units. 501 HAA Regiment merged into 275 Regiment, RA (the former 75th (Highland) Field Rgt from which 297 HAA Bty had originally been transferred).

== Commanding Officers ==
The following served as CO of the regiment:

- Bt Col G.D.K. Murray, OBE, MC, TD – from formation; later Brigadier
- Lt-Col H.V. Kerr – in Burma
- Lt-Col J. Green – in Burma
- Maj H.E. Ruddock – in Burma
