= William Wyndham Green =

British Army general (1887–1979)

Lieutenant-General Sir William Wyndham Green KBE CB DSO MC* DL
- Born: 15 May 1887; South Kensington, London, England
- Died: 12 November 1979 (aged 92); New Romney
- Military career
- Allegiance: United Kingdom
- Branch: British Army
- Service years: 1907–1946
- Rank: Lieutenant-General
- Service number: 690
- Unit: Royal Artillery
- Commands: Anti-Aircraft Command (1945–1946); 6th Anti-Aircraft Group (1943–1945); 5th Anti-Aircraft Group (1942–1943); 3rd Anti-Aircraft Division (1942); Royal Military College of Science (1938–1940)
- Conflicts: First World War; Second World War
- Awards: Knight Commander of the Order of the British Empire; Companion of the Order of the Bath; Distinguished Service Order; Military Cross & Bar; Mentioned in Despatches

Lieutenant-General Sir William Wyndham Green, KBE, CB, DSO, MC & Bar, DL (15 May 1887 – 12 November 1979) was a senior British Army officer who served as General Officer Commanding-in-Chief, Anti-Aircraft Command from 1945 to 1946.

== Military career ==
Educated at Malvern College and the Royal Military Academy, Woolwich, Green was commissioned into the Royal Artillery in 1907. He served in the First World War latterly as a brigade major in France. He was awarded the Military Cross for correcting gunfire from the top of a haystack 200 yards from the enemy front line in December 1914, and a bar to the award, the citation for which reads:

For conspicuous gallantry and devotion to duty. During an enemy retirement he went forward to high ground, which afforded good observation, to ascertain the situation, and remained exposed to shell fire all the morning, until wounded by a shell. His fearlessness and initiative enabled him to secure valuable information by means of personal reconnaissances during operations, and on one occasion he displayed the utmost gallantry in extinguishing a burning gun-pit under heavy and accurate shell fire.

Green also received the Distinguished Service Order at Ploegsteert in April the following year. The citation reads:

For conspicuous gallantry and devotion to duty. Under cover of a heavy morning mist, the enemy came up unperceived close to the battery of which this officer was in command. He armed the Lewis gunners of the Battery with rifles, and by skilful dispositions held off the enemy until the guns had been blown up and the detachments withdrawn. On another occasion he helped to cover the removal of a heavy howitzer battery, delaying the advance of the enemy with the fire of his Lewis guns and rifles and inflicting heavy casualties. He fought all day on foot, until the line had been established. His behaviour throughout was marked by great coolness under difficult circumstances and unconcerned courage.

After attending the Staff College, Camberley, from 1919 to 1920, in 1926 Green became an instructor in Gunnery at the School of Artillery. In 1929 he went to India and served on the North West Frontier, before returning to the School of Artillery in 1937 as Chief Instructor for Equipment. In 1938 he was appointed Commandant at the Royal Military College of Science.

Green served in the Second World War initially as Brigadier Royal Artillery at Northern Command and then, from March to October 1941, as second-in-command City and Garrison of Gibraltar. In 1942 he became commander of the 3rd Anti-Aircraft Division and in 1943 he was made commander of the 5th and 6th Anti-Aircraft Groups.

After the war Green was appointed General Officer Commanding-in-Chief at Anti-Aircraft Command; he retired in 1946. He was also a Colonel Commandant of the Royal Artillery from 1947 to 1952.

== Family ==
In January 1916 Green married Madge Alexandra Bellairs and had one daughter, then in 1924 he married Aline Hope Primrose Cobbold and they went on to have one son and a daughter. The family home was at Little Gables in New Romney in Kent. He was a Deputy Lieutenant for the county in 1949.

== Bibliography ==
- Smart, Nick (2005). Biographical Dictionary of British Generals of the Second World War. Barnesley: Pen & Sword. ISBN 1844150496.

Military offices
Preceded by Sir Frederick Pile	GOC-in-C Anti-Aircraft Command; 1945–1946	Succeeded by Sir Otto Lund
