= Lancelot Hickes =

Major-General Lancelot Hickes CB OBE MC
- Born: 30 May 1884; Hornsey, London
- Died: 4 October 1965 (aged 81)
- Military career
- Allegiance: United Kingdom
- Branch: British Army
- Service years: 1903–1942
- Rank: Major-General
- Service number: 1867
- Unit: Royal Artillery
- Commands: 3rd Anti-Aircraft Division (1938–39)
- Conflicts: First World War; Second World War
- Awards: Companion of the Order of the Bath; Officer of the Order of the British Empire; Military Cross; Mentioned in Despatches

Major-General Lancelot Daryl Hickes, CB, OBE, MC (30 May 1884 – 4 October 1965) was a senior British Army officer during the Second World War.

== Early life ==
Lancelot Hickes was born on 30 May 1884 in Hornsey, North London, to William Alexander Jardine Hickes and Emilie Louise Hickes (née Keller). He was educated at Bedford School and at the Royal Military Academy, Woolwich, from which he was commissioned as a second lieutenant in the Royal Garrison Artillery in 1903. Between 1908 and 1914 he embarked on the first of two tours with the Royal Garrison Artillery as part of the West African Frontier Force.

Hickes served with distinction during the First World War, was mentioned in despatches four times, promoted to the rank of captain in 1914 and brevetted major in 1918, receiving the Military Cross. He was appointed an Officer of the Order of the British Empire in 1919 and, after attending the Staff College, Camberley, from 1920 to 1921, returned to serve again with the West African Frontier Force from 1921 to 1925.

Hickes was as an instructor at Senior Officers' School from 1936 to 1937, and in 1938 became Assistant Director of the Territorial Army. At the outset of the Second World War he was promoted to the rank of major general, and served as General Officer Commanding 3rd Anti-Aircraft Division from 1938 to 1939, responsible for Scotland's Anti-Aircraft defences.

Major General Hickes was director of staff duties at the War Office between 1939 and 1941. He was appointed a Companion of the Order of the Bath in 1941. He retired from the British Army in 1942 and died on 4 October 1965, survived by his only child, Major Anthony Denis Hickes, from his first marriage to Vera Hickes (née Newbury).

== Bibliography ==
- Smart, Nick (2005). Biographical Dictionary of British Generals of the Second World War. Barnesley: Pen & Sword. ISBN 1844150496.
