= 42nd Anti-Aircraft Brigade =

42nd Anti-Aircraft Brigade 68 Anti-Aircraft Brigade
- Active: 1 October 1938 – 20 February 1944; 1 January 1947 – 25 April 1955
- Country: United Kingdom
- Branch: Territorial Army
- Type: Anti-Aircraft Brigade
- Role: Air Defence
- Part of: 3 AA Division; 12 AA Division; 6 AA Group; 3 AA Group
- Garrison/HQ: Glasgow
- Engagements: Battle of Britain; The Blitz

42nd Anti-Aircraft Brigade was an air defence formation of Britain's Territorial Army (TA). It was responsible for protecting extensive residential, industrial and shipping areas around Greater Glasgow and the Firth of Clyde during the Second World War.

== Mobilisation ==
With the expansion of Britain's Anti-Aircraft (AA) defences during the late 1930s, new formations were created to command the growing number of Royal Artillery (RA) and Royal Engineers (RE) AA gun and searchlight units. 42nd AA Brigade was raised on 1 October 1938 at Glasgow, and formed part of 3rd AA Division, which had been created a month earlier for the air defence of Scotland and Northern Ireland. 42 AA Brigade's first commander was Brigadier W.M.M.O'D. Welsh, DSO, MC, appointed 1 October 1938.

At the time the brigade was formed, the TA's AA units were in a state of mobilisation because of the Munich crisis, although they were soon stood down. In February 1939 Britain's AA defences came under the control of a new Anti-Aircraft Command. In June a partial mobilisation of TA units was begun in a process known as 'couverture', whereby each unit did a month's tour of duty in rotation to man selected AA and searchlight positions. AA Command mobilised fully on 24 August, ahead of the official declaration of war on 3 September.

=== Order of battle 1939 ===
On mobilisation in August 1939, 42nd AA Bde had the following composition:

- 74th (City of Glasgow) AA Regiment, RA – new Heavy AA gun unit formed at Glasgow in 1938
  - HQ and 230th–232nd Batteries
- 83rd (Blythswood) AA Regiment, RA – Heavy AA gun unit converted from 7th (Blythswood) Battalion, Highland Light Infantry in 1938
  - HQ and 257th–259th Batteries at Bridgeton, Glasgow
- 100th AA Regiment, RA – new Heavy AA gun unit formed at Motherwell in 1939
  - HQ, 304th and 305th Batteries
- 42nd AA Brigade Company, Royal Army Service Corps

The AA regiments of the RA were redesignated Heavy AA (HAA) in 1940 to distinguish them from the new Light AA (LAA) regiments being formed.

== Phoney War ==
Attacks on Royal Navy bases early in the so-called Phoney War period prompted calls for stronger AA defences at Scapa Flow, Invergordon, Rosyth and the Clyde anchorage, and 3rd AA Division was given priority for delivery of HAA guns. The defenders had problems at Scapa, where a chain of rugged islands enclose an extensive area of water, which stretched beyond the reach of HAA fire from the islands. Installing gun positions on the islands required an immense amount of labour. A new Luftwaffe attack on 16 March 1940 caught the defences half-prepared: only 52 out of 64 HAA guns were fit for action, and 30 out of 108 searchlights. About 15 Junkers Ju 88s approached at low level in the dusk: half dived on the warships and the rest attacked the airfield. 44 HAA guns of 42 AA Bde engaged, but their predictors were defeated by erratic courses and low height. 17 LAA guns also engaged, but the Gun layers were blinded by gun-flashes in the half light. No enemy aircraft were brought down. A subsequent inquiry concluded that the low level attack had evaded radar, the gun lay-out still left gaps in the perimeter, and guns were out of action awaiting spare parts.

== The Blitz ==
Following the Luftwaffe's heavy losses during daylight bombing in the Battle of Britain, it began night attacks on Britain's towns and cities ('The Blitz'), with targets including aerodromes, aircraft industry, ports, and shipping. 3rd AA Division's responsibilities were split in November 1940 and a new 12th AA Division created, to which 42nd AA Bde was transferred, with its responsibility restricted to the defence of Glasgow and the Firth of Clyde. The industrial town and seaport of Clydebank, on the River Clyde to the west of Glasgow, was badly hit on the nights of 13/14 and 14/15 March 1941 in the 'Clydebank Blitz', but none of the raiders was brought down by AA fire. The urgent need for more HAA guns on Clydeside was well known: the authorised scale had been 80 in 1939, raised to 120 in 1940, but in February 1941 there were still only 67. A new scale of 144 guns was authorised on 21 March, but only 88 were in position. There were three other heavy raids in 1941 on Clydeside during the Blitz; on the nights of 7/8 April, 5/6 May, and 6/7 May, when the Greenock Blitz attacked the seaport and industrial town at the mouth of the river.

=== Order of Battle 1940–41 ===
Formation sign of 12 AA Division worn 1940–42.

By this stage of the war, 42nd AA Bde's order of battle was as follows:

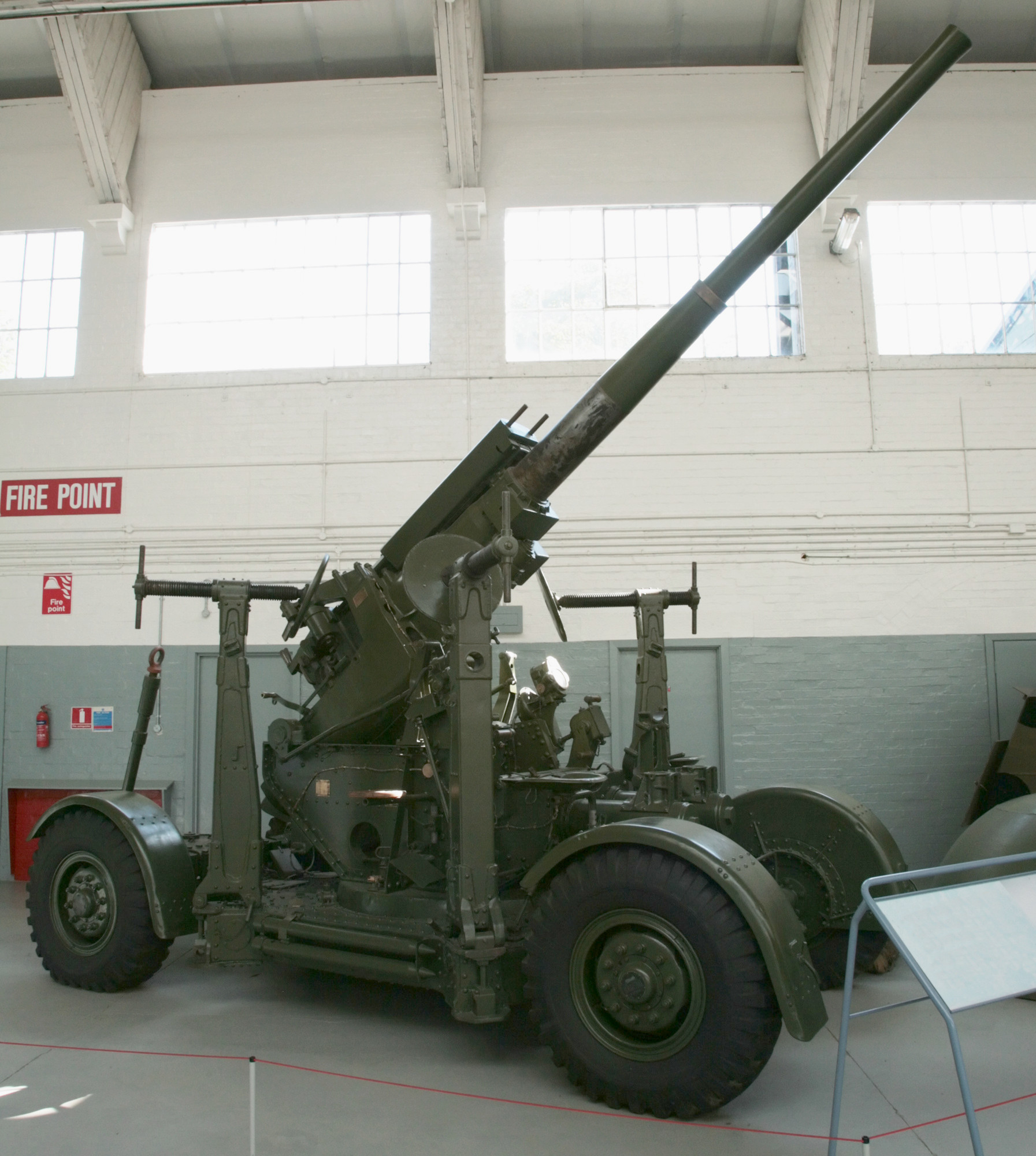
QF 3.7-inch AA gun preserved at Imperial War Museum Duxford.

- 73rd HAA Rgt – from 7 AA Division May 1941
  - 209, 210, 311 HAA Btys
- 83rd HAA Rgt – left Summer 1941; later to Tenth Army in Iraq
  - 257, 258, 259 HAA Btys
- 100th HAA Rgt
  - 304, 305, 321, 406 HAA Btys
- 111th HAA Rgt – new regiment formed October 1940; to 3 AA Bde (Northern Ireland) June 1941
  - 347, 356, 389 HAA Btys
  - 355 HAA Bty – attached to 3 AA Bde
- 123rd HAA Rgt – new regiment formed in February 1941
  - 402, 403, 404, 417 HAA Btys
- 18th LAA Rgt – New regiment formed at Glasgow September 1939; attached to 63 AA Bde May 1941
  - 99, 139, 252 LAA Btys at Glasgow
  - 56 LAA Bty at Ardeer
- 60th LAA Rgt – New regiment formed November 1940 to 63 AA Bde by May 1941
  - 180, 181, 187 LAA Btys

(By this time, 74th HAA Rgt was on its way to Egypt.)

== Mid war ==
As the war progressed, units equipped with Z Battery rocket launchers appeared, and several of the existing TA AA units went overseas, to be replaced by war-formed units, many of them 'mixed', including women of the Auxiliary Territorial Service. By June 42, 83 HAA and 18 LAA Rgts had joined Tenth Army in Iraq.

=== Order of Battle 1941–42 ===
The composition of the brigade was completely reorganised in the summer of 1941, giving it the following order of battle from September (temporary attachments omitted):

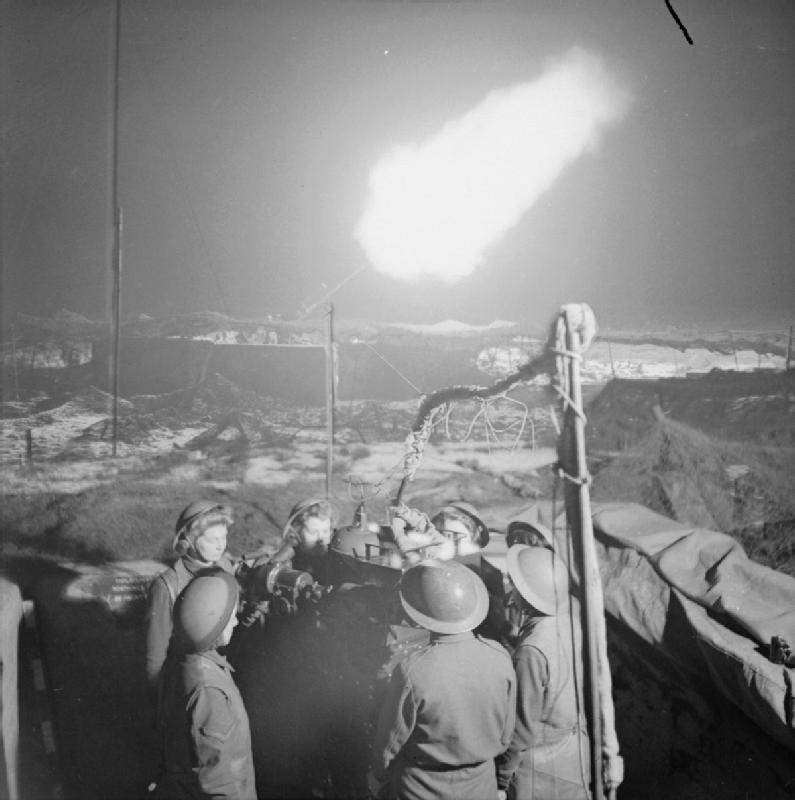
ATS spotters at an HAA gun site in Scotland, January 1943.

- 59th (Essex Regiment) HAA Rgt – from 8 AA Division; to 6 AA Division by December 1941
  - 164, 167, 265, 429 HAA Btys
- 60th (City of London) HAA Rgt – from 11 AA Division; to 57 AA Bde May 1942; later to India
  - 168, 169, 206, 359 HAA Btys
- 100th HAA Rgt – to 57 AA Bde May 1942; in Middle East Forces by May 1943, later serving under Eighth Army in the Italian campaign
  - 304, 305, 321, 406 HAA Btys
- 123rd HAA Rgt – to 7 AA Division by May 1942
  - 402, 403, 404, 417 HAA Btys
- 126th HAA Rgt – new regiment formed July 1941
  - 423, 425, 426 HAA Btys

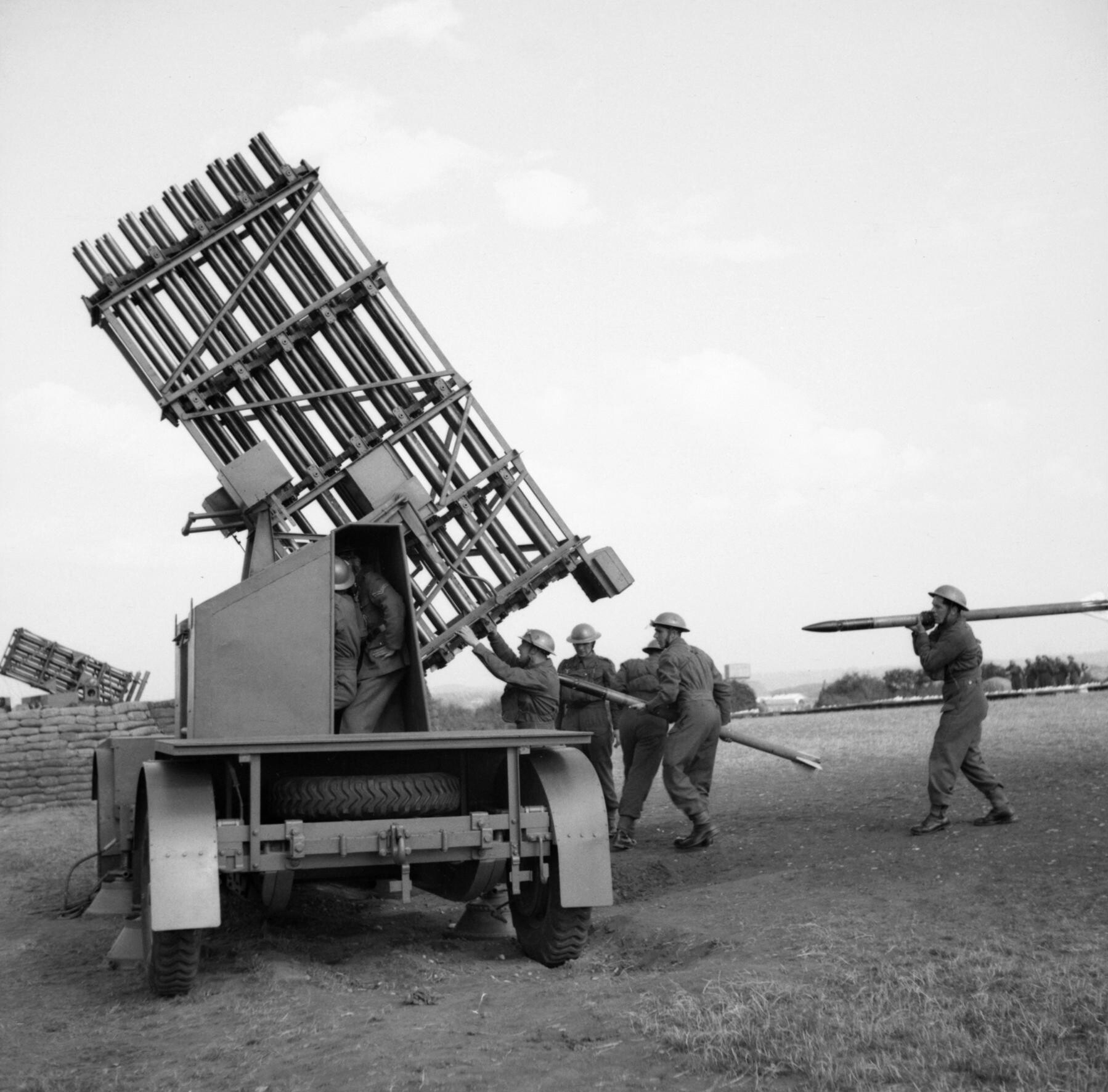
Loading a mobile multiple 4-inch Z projector, 1941

- 130th (Mixed) HAA Rgt – new regiment formed August 1941
  - 442, 443, 448, 449 (M) HAA Btys
- 155th (Mixed) HAA Rgt – from 57 AA Bde August 1942
  - 525, 528, 531, 537 (M) HAA Btys
- 170th (Mixed) HAA Rgt – new regiment formed August 1942
  - 528, 547, 554, 567, 568 (M) HAA Btys
- 3rd AA 'Z' Rgt – to 3 AA Division May 1942
  - 103 Z Bty – left before May 1942
  - 107, 115, 118 Z Btys
  - 191 Z Bty – joined March 1942
- 11th AA 'Z' Rgt
  - 134, 146 Z Btys
  - 136 Z Bty – joined August 1942
  - 147 Z Bty – to Orkney and Shetland Defences (OSDEF) August 1942
- 42 AA Brigade Signal Office Mixed Subsection – part of 1 Company, 12 AA Division Mixed Signal Unit, Royal Corps of Signals (RCS)

== Later war ==
The AA divisions in the UK were disbanded in September 1942 and replaced by a system of AA Groups corresponding to the Groups of RAF Fighter Command. 42nd AA Bde came under 6 AA Group based at Edinburgh and affiliated to No. 14 Group RAF.

=== Order of Battle 1942–44 ===
The composition of the brigade at this time was as follows (temporary attachments omitted):

- 86th (Honourable Artillery Company) HAA Rgt – from 36 (Scottish) AA Bde November 1942; to Second Army for Operation Overlord February 1943
  - 273, 274, 383 HAA Btys
- 130th (M) HAA Rgt – to 30 (Northumbrian) AA Bde Summer 1943
  - 442, 443, 448, 449 (M) HAA Btys
- 135th (M) HAA Rgt – from 30 AA Bde Summer 1943
  - 466, 467, 473, 491 (M) HAA Btys
- 147th HAA Rgt – from 3 AA Division; to 51 AA Bde November 1942
  - 358, 360, 403, 427 HAA Btys
- 158th (M) HAA Rgt – from 51 AA Bde November 1943
  - 540, 541, 548, 572 (M) HAA Btys
- 170th (M) HAA Rgt – to 30 AA Bde April 1943
  - 528, 554, 567, 568 (M) HAA Btys

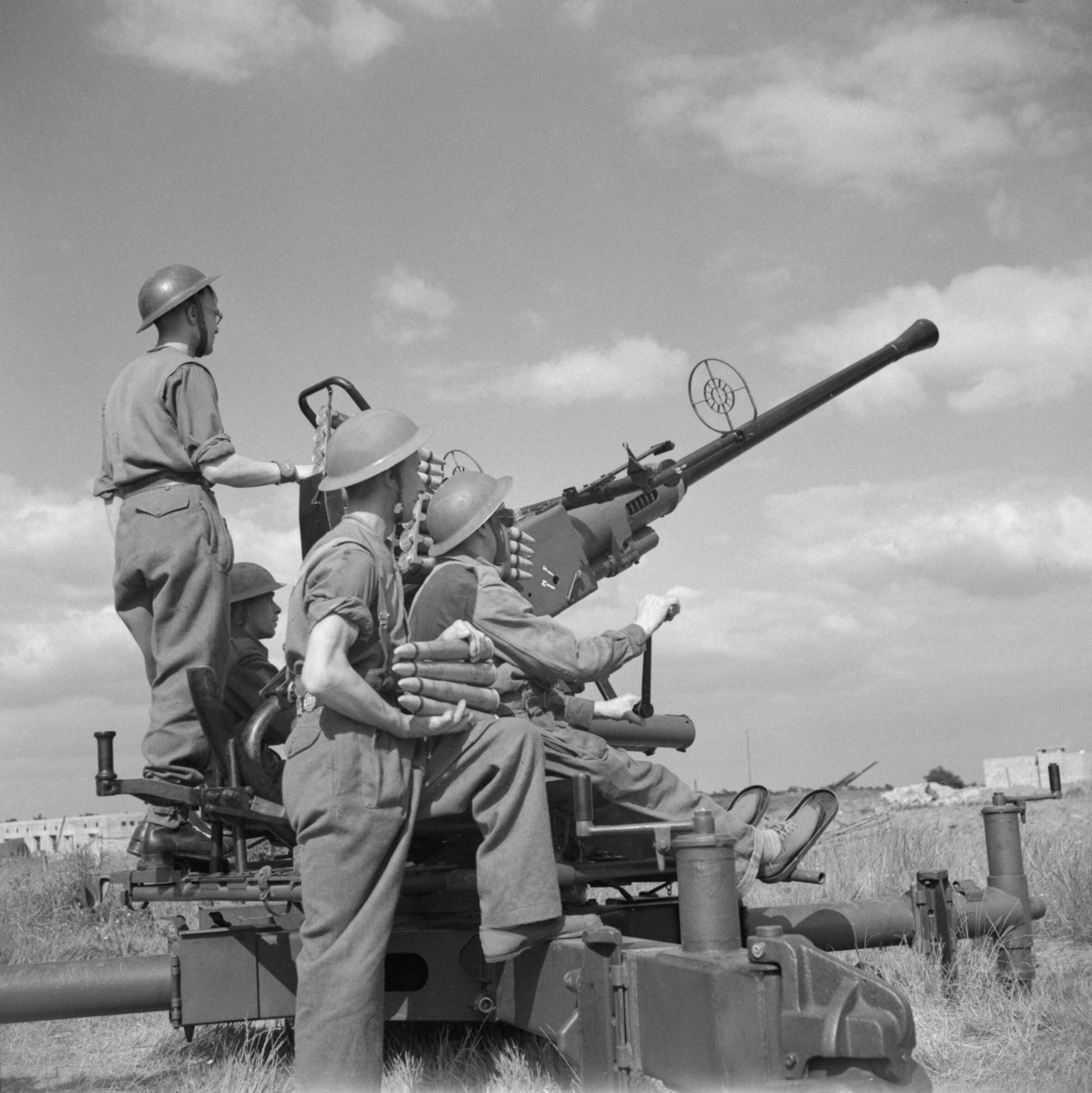
40 mm Bofors LAA gun and crew.

- 180th (M) HAA Rgt – new regiment formed October 1942; to 36 (Scottish) AA Bde November 1943
  - 547, 586 (M) HAA Btys
  - 609 (M) HAA Bty – joined January 1943
  - 613 (M) HAA Bty – joined by March 1943
- 188th (M) HAA Rgt – new regiment formed January 1943; to 7 AA Group May 1943
  - 630, 631 (M) HAA Btys
- 81st LAA Rgt – from 5 AA Group November 1943
  - 199, 261, 307 LAA Btys
- 57th (8th Bn Cameronians (Scottish Rifles)) Searchlight Rgt – from 63 AA Bde November 1942; to 57 AA Bde December 1942
  - 420, 421, 422, 423 S/L Btys
- 11th AA 'Z' Rgt
  - 134, 136 Z Btys
  - 146 Z Bty – to 16th AA 'Z' Rgt November 1942
  - 147 Z Bty – left January 1943
  - 107 Z Bty – from 3 AA 'Z' Rgt December 1942
  - 115 Z Bty – from 3 AA 'Z' Rgt January 1943
  - 224 Z Bty – joined January 1943
- 42 AA Brigade Mixed Signal Office Section – part of 3 Company, 6 AA Group Mixed Signal Unit, RCS

== Disbandment ==
By early 1944 aerial attacks against Scotland were rare and the AA defences could be scaled back. 6 AA Group HQ moved to the south of England to defend the embarkation ports for Operation Overlord (the planned Normandy landings) and to prepare for the expected assault with V-1 flying bombs, and 42 AA Brigade HQ was disbanded at Edinburgh on 20 February 1944.

== Postwar ==
When the TA was reconstituted on 1 January 1947, 42 AA Bde was reorganised as 68 AA Brigade (TA), (Note: The TA AA brigades were now numbered 51 and upwards, rather than 26 and upwards as in the 1930s; the wartime 68th AA Bde had been disbanded in 1944.) with its HQ at Glasgow, forming part of 3 AA Group at Edinburgh. It comprised the following units:

- 500 (Mobile) HAA Rgt at Hamilton – formerly 100 HAA Rgt, see above
- 518 LAA Rgt at Maryhill – formerly 18 LAA Rgt, see above
- 554 (Argyll & Sutherland Highlanders) LAA Rgt at Milngavie – formerly 54 LAA Rgt in 9th Armoured Division, originally 9th (Dunbartonshire) Bn, Argyll and Sutherland Highlanders
- 558 (Mobile) HAA Rgt at Wishaw – formerly 58 (Argyll and Sutherland Highlanders) LAA Rgt, duplicate of 54 LAA Rgt

On 1 October 1948, the brigade became a Regular Army HQ and dropped the '(TA)' part of its title, though continuing to command its TA units. In 1950, 500 and 558 HAA Regiments merged, as 558 HAA Rgt at Coatdyke, and 518 LAA Rgt merged with 591st (Cameronians) (Mixed) LAA/Searchlight Rgt (formerly 125 LAA Rgt, originally 5/8th Bn, The Cameronians (Scottish Rifles)).

AA Command was abolished on 10 March 1955, when 558 HAA was disbanded and the other regiments of 68 AA Bde underwent mergers. A few weeks later, HQ 68 AA Bde itself was converted into HQ 1st Army Group Royal Artillery (Field). It joined the British Army of the Rhine as a Corps artillery HQ in 1958 and was redesignated again as 1st Artillery Brigade in 1961.

== External sources ==
- British and Commonwealth Military Badge Forum
- British Military History
- Generals of World War II
- Orders of Battle at Patriot Files
- British Army units from 1945 on
- The Royal Artillery 1939–45
- Graham Watson, The Territorial Army 1947
