= 3rd Anti-Aircraft Division =

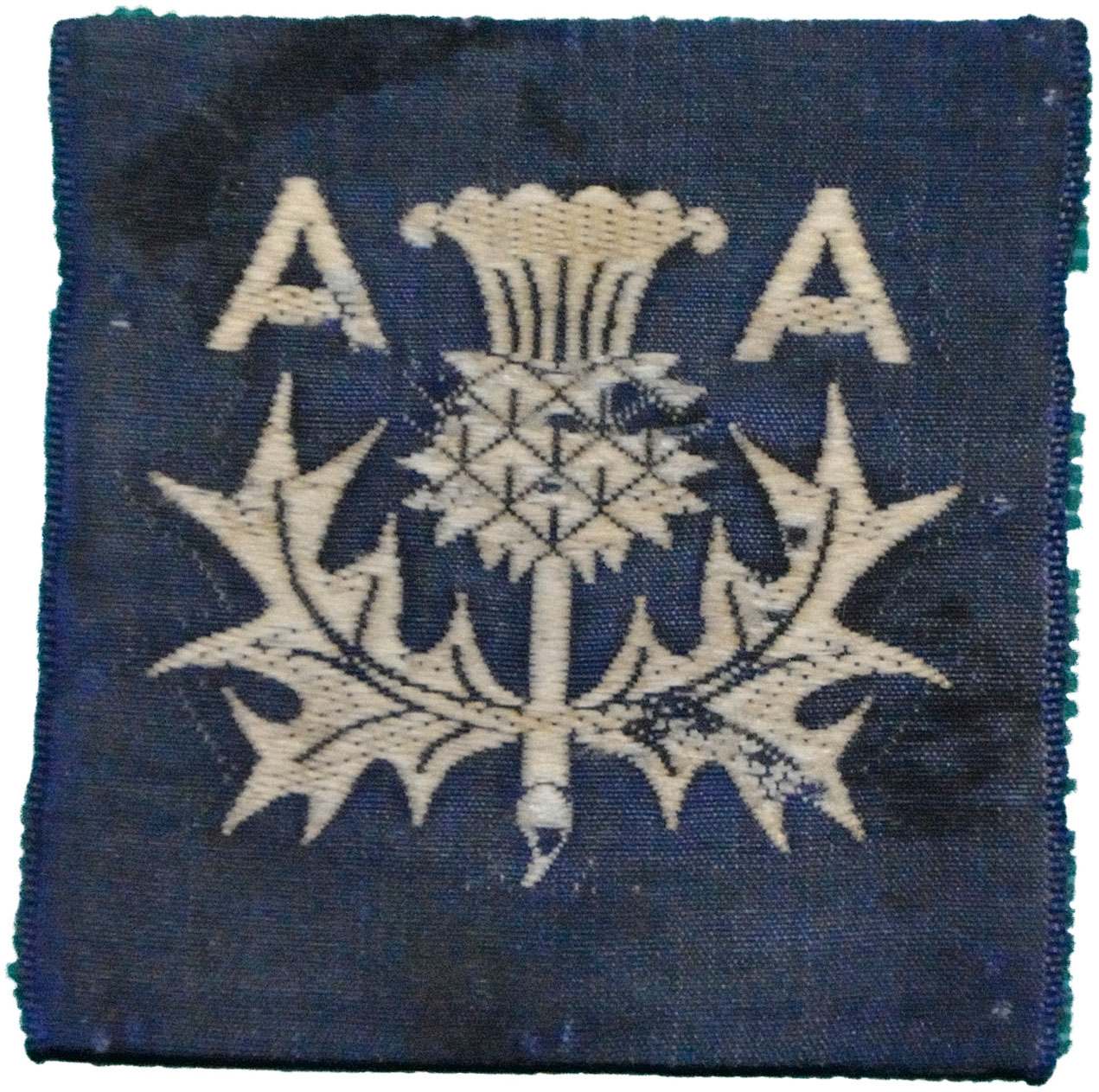
- Formation sign for the 3rd Anti-Aircraft Division.
- Active: 1 September 1939 – 30 September 1942
- Country: United Kingdom
- Branch: Territorial Army
- Type: Anti-Aircraft Division
- Role: Air Defence
- Part of: Anti-Aircraft Command (1939–40); III AA Corps (1940–42); I AA Corps (1942)
- Engagements: The Blitz

Commanders
- Notable commanders: Maj-Gen Lancelot Hickes; Maj-Gen William Wyndham Green

The 3rd Anti-Aircraft Division was an air defence formation of the Territorial Army, part of the British Army, created in the period of tension before the outbreak of the Second World War. It defended Scotland and Northern Ireland during the early part of the war.

== Origin ==
Large numbers of Territorial Army (TA) units were converted to anti-aircraft (AA) and searchlight roles in the Royal Artillery (RA) and Royal Engineers (RE) during the 1930s, and higher formations were required to control them. The 3rd AA Division was the first division-level headquarters created de novo (earlier ones being converted infantry divisions). It was formed at Edinburgh on 1 September 1938 within Scottish Command, transferring to Anti-Aircraft Command when that formation was created on 1 April 1939. It was responsible for the AA defences of Scotland, including Northern Ireland and the Orkney and Shetland Defences (OSDEF). It operated with No 13 Group of RAF Fighter Command, covering Scotland and the North of England.

== Order of battle ==
The composition of the 3rd AA Division on the outbreak of war was as follows:

- 3rd Anti-Aircraft Brigade formed 7 December 1938 at Belfast. The TA did not exist in Northern Ireland before the war, so the part-time units in the province were part of the Supplementary Reserve and were numbered in sequence after the Regulars.
  - 3rd (Ulster) Searchlight Regiment, RA (SR) – formed 1939
  - 8th (Belfast) AA Regiment, RA (SR) – formed 1939
  - 9th (Londonderry) AA Regiment, RA (SR) – formed 1939
  - 102nd AA Regiment, RA (TA) – formed at Antrim 10 September 1939
  - 3rd AA Brigade Signal Section, Royal Corps of Signals (RCS)
  - 92nd AA Brigade Company, Royal Army Service Corps (RASC)
  - 3rd AA Brigade Workshop Section, Royal Army Ordnance Corps (RAOC)
- 36th (Scottish) Anti-Aircraft Brigade formed 1 May 1938 at Edinburgh, responsible for the city of Edinburgh and the Firth of Forth
  - 71st (Forth) AA Regiment, RA – formed 1938 at Dunfermline
  - 94th AA Regiment, RA – formed April 1939 at Turnhouse
  - 101st AA Regiment, RA – formed August 1939 at Inverness
  - 36 AA Brigade Company RASC
- 42nd Anti-Aircraft Brigade formed 1 October 1938 at Glasgow, responsible for the city of Glasgow, other urban areas in Greater Glasgow, and the Firth of Clyde
  - 74th (City of Glasgow) AA Regiment, RA
  - 83rd (Blythswood) AA Regiment, RA – converted 1938 from the 7th (Blythswood) Battalion, Highland Light Infantry
  - 100th AA Regiment, RA – formed at Motherwell
  - 42nd AA Brigade Company RASC
- 51st Light Anti-Aircraft Brigade formed 25 August 1939 at Edinburgh, originally to command the LAA units of the 3rd AA Division, but later assumed responsibility for north east Scotland
  - 14th (West Lothian Royal Scots) Light AA Regiment, RA – converted August 1938 from part of the 4th/5th Battalion Royal Scots at Linlithgow
  - 18th LAA Regiment, RA – formed December 1938 at Glasgow
  - 19th LAA Regiment, RA – formed January 1939 at Edinburgh
  - 31st LAA Regiment, RA – formed August 1939 at Perth
  - 32nd LAA Regiment, RA – formed August 1939 at Falkirk
  - 51st AA Brigade Company RASC
- 52nd Light Anti-Aircraft Brigade formed August 1939 at Stirling with responsibility for searchlight provision across the 3rd AA Division's sectors
  - 51st (Highland) Anti-Aircraft Battalion, Royal Engineers – formed in 1938 at Aberdeen
  - 4th/5th Battalion, Royal Scots (52nd Searchlight Regiment) – converted 1938 from part of the 4th/5th Bn in central Edinburgh
  - 5th Battalion, Cameronians (Scottish Rifles) (56th Searchlight Regiment) – converted 1938 from 5/8th Bn Cameronians (Scottish Rifles) at Glasgow
  - 8th Battalion, Cameronians (Scottish Rifles) (57th Searchlight Regiment) – formed 1 November 1938 by duplication of the above, based in south Glasgow
  - 52nd AA Brigade Company RASC
- 3rd AA Divisional Signals, RCS formed in Edinburgh in 1939
- 3dr AA Divisional Workshops, RAOC

== Mobilisation ==
Mobilisation in the last week of August 1939 was difficult for the 3rd AA Division, which had the task of moving troops, guns and stores by road and by sea to remote and inaccessible sites in Orkney to defend the fleet anchorage at Scapa Flow, which had high priority.

At this point, the division had a strength of 111 HAA guns, while in the LAA role there were 18 3-inch, 5 2-pounder 'pom-pom' and 40 mm Bofors guns, and 340 light machine guns (LMGs), together with 159 searchlights. The HAA guns were deployed in the defended areas as follows:

- Firth of Forth – 28 (plus 1 out of action)
- Firth of Clyde – 19 (plus 3 out of action)
- Scapa Flow – 8
- Invergordon – 2 (plus 2 out of action)
- Tyneside – 34
- Teesside – 14

Shortly afterwards, Tyneside and Teesside became the responsibility of a new the 7th AA Division, and the 3rd AA Division was able to concentrate on defending Scotland.

== Phoney War ==
Unlike most of Britain's defence forces, the 3rd AA Division was frequently in action during the so-called Phoney War that lasted from September 1939 to May 1940. The first action occurred unexpectedly on 16 October 1939, when nine enemy aircraft suddenly appeared out of cloud and dived on warships off Rosyth Dockyard, close to the Forth Bridge. No warning had been given, but gun positions of the 71st HAA Rgt hastily loaded for a 'crash' action under individual gun control, normal prediction being impossible against diving and turning targets. A total of 104 rounds were fired and one aircraft had its tail shot off (fighters accounted for another two). HMS Southampton was damaged. The following day, 14 hostile aircraft in three waves attacked warships lying in Scapa Flow. The 226th Battery of the 101st HAA Rgt was able to engage and claimed one shot down. Among the vessels damaged in this raid was the Jutland veteran HMS Iron Duke, acting as a base ship and floating AA battery.

These attacks led to calls for strengthened AA defence for the naval bases at Scapa Flow, Invergordon, Rosyth and the Clyde anchorage, and the 3rd AA Division was given priority for new guns. Starting in January 1940, the division was to receive 64 3.7-inch and 32 4.5-inch HAA guns and an increase to 100 searchlights, but only 10 Bofors and some Naval 2-pounders were available for LAA defence. The 3rd AA Division had many problems at Scapa, where a chain of rugged islands enclose an extensive area of water, which stretched beyond the reach of HAA fire from the islands. Installing gun positions on the islands required an immense amount of labour. A new Luftwaffe attack on 16 March 1940 caught the defences half-prepared: only 52 out of 64 HAA guns were fit for action, and 30 out of 108 SLs. About 15 Junkers Ju 88s approached at low level in the dusk: half dived on the warships and the rest attacked the airfield. 44 HAA guns of 42 AA Brigade engaged, but their predictors were defeated by erratic courses and low height. 17 LAA guns also engaged, but the Gun layers were blinded by gun-flashes in the half light. No enemy aircraft were brought down. A subsequent inquiry concluded that the low level attack had evaded radar, the gun lay-out still left gaps in the perimeter, and guns were out of action awaiting spare parts.

There were three more attacks on Scapa Flow the following month. On 4 April, a formation estimated at 12 Ju 88s carried out a series of medium- and low-level runs, dropping bombs and machine-gunning AA positions, and escaped without loss. Four days later, 12 Heinkel He 111s spent 2 hours over the anchorage carrying out individual attacks, but four were shot down. On 10 April about 20 hostile aircraft made a night raid; some were successfully illuminated and three shot down. The Scapa defences were clearly improved, and close concentrations of fire over warships, supplemented by naval AA fire, could now hold off dive-bombing attacks. The Luftwaffe now turned its attention to the campaigns in Norway and France and the Low Countries

In November 1939, the 3rd AA Brigade HQ and some of its units were sent to France with the British Expeditionary Force, defending the lines of communication. The 3rd AA Brigade HQ returned to Northern Ireland after the Dunkirk evacuation.

== Battle of Britain ==
On 11 July 1940, at the start of the Battle of Britain, the guns of the 3rd AA Division under the command of Maj-Gen Leslie Hill were deployed as follows:

- Belfast – 7
- Clyde – 28
- Ardeer – 4
- Kyle of Lochalsh – 4
- Aberdeen – 4
- Scapa Flow – 88
- Shetlands – 12
- Airfields – 8
- Vulnerable Points – 119 (mainly Bofors gun)

The 3rd AA Division was now cooperating with Fighter Command's No 14 Group, recently reformed to cover Scotland.

In 1940, the Royal Artillery's AA regiments were designated 'Heavy AA' (HAA) to distinguish them from the newer Light AA (LAA) units. (Prior to that, some of the Regular Army and Supplementary Reserve regiments had included both HAA and LAA batteries.) Also during 1940, all the searchlight units, whether AA battalions of the RE or still forming part of their parent infantry regiments, were transferred to the RA. The units of the 52nd AA Brigade were therefore redesignated as follows:

- 51st (Highland) Searchlight Regiment, RA – from January 1940
- 52nd (Queen's Edinburgh, Royal Scots) Searchlight Regiment, RA – from August 1940
- 56th (Cameronians) Searchlight Regiment, RA – from August 1940
- 57th (Glasgow) Searchlight Regiment, RA – from August 1940

In September 1940, the 3rd AA Division formed the 3rd AA Z Regiment, equipped with Z Battery rocket projectiles.

In November 1940, at the height of The Blitz, a new 12th AA Division was formed to take over responsibility for western Scotland and Northern Ireland, while the 3rd AA Division retained responsibility for eastern Scotland. The 3rd and 42nd AA Brigades were transferred from the 3rd AA Division to the new formation, and 12 AA Divisional Signals was formed by expanding the Glasgow company of 3 AA Divisional Signals. Both 3 and 12 AA Divisions, together with OSDEF and the 7th AA Division covering northern England, formed part of a newly created III AA Corps, and the 3rd AA Division's commander, Maj-Gen Hugh Martin, was promoted to command the new higher formation.

== Blitz ==
From November 1940 and during The Blitz, the 3rd AA Division's order of battle was therefore as follows:

- 36th AA Brigade Edinburgh & Forth
  - 71st HAA Rgt – as above; left October 1941
  - 114th HAA Rgt – formed November 1940
  - 31st LAA Rgt – as above
  - 32nd LAA Rgt – as above
- 51st AA Brigade NE Scotland
  - 108th HAA Rgt – formed August 1940
  - 40th LAA Rgt – formed September 1939
  - 67th LAA Rgt – formed December 1940
- 52nd AA Brigade Searchlights
  - 51st S/L Rgt – as above
  - 52nd S/L Rgt – as above
  - 56th S/L Rgt – as above
- 3rd AA Z Rgt
- 3rd AA Divisional Signals, RCS
- 3rd AA Divisional RASC
  - 195th and 225th Companies
- 3rd AA Divisional Company, Royal Army Medical Corps
- 3rd AA Divisional Workshop Company, RAOC
- 3rd AA Divisional Radio Maintenance Company, RAOC (joined during 1941)

== Mid-war ==
After December 1941, the division's order of battle was as follows:

36th AA Brigade

- 114th HAA Rgt – to the 51st AA Brigade May 1942
- 129th (Mixed) HAA Rgt – formed August 1941
- 19th LAA Rgt – joined 1941; left February 1942
- 20th LAA Rgt – joined 1942; left June 1942
- 72nd LAA Rgt – joined August 1941; left
- 95th LAA Rgt – joined from the 51st AA Brigade June 1942
- 135th LAA Rgt – formed February 1942; to the 52nd AA Brigade June 1942
- 46th (Lincolnshire Rgt) S/L Rgt – joined Spring 1942

51st AA Brigade

- 65th (Manchester Regiment) HAA Rgt – joined and left December 1941
- 100th HAA Rgt – joined June 1942
- 101st HAA Rgt – joined June 1941; left June 1942
- 108th HAA Rgt – left June 1941
- 114th HAA Rgt – joined from the 36th AA Brigade May 1942
- 40th LAA Rgt – transferred to the 51st (Highland) Division May 1942
- 67th LAA Rgt – to the 52nd AA Brigade
- 95th LAA Rgt – formed November 1941; to the 36th AA Brigade June 1942
- 131st LAA Rgt – joined June 1942

52nd AA Brigade

- 51st S/L Rgt – left and became the 124th (Highland) LAA Regiment February 1942
- 52nd S/L Rgt – became the 130th (Queen's Edinburgh, Royal Scots) LAA Regiment March 1942 and remained with brigade
- 56th S/L Rgt – left and became the 125th (Cameronians) LAA Regiment in February 1942
- 147th HAA Rgt – formed February 1942
- 67th LAA Rgt – joined from the 51st AA Brigade Spring 1942; left June 1942
- 135th LAA Rgt – joined from the 36th AA Brigade Spring 1942

'Mixed' indicates that women of the Auxiliary Territorial Service (ATS) were integrated into the unit.

The increased sophistication of Operations Rooms and communications was reflected in the growth in support units, which attained the following organisation by May 1942:

- 3rd AA Division Mixed Signal Unit HQ, RCS
  - HQ No 1 Company
    - 2nd AA Division Mixed Signal Office Section
    - 403rd AA Gun Operations Room Mixed Signal Section
    - 7th AA Sub-Gun Operations Room Mixed Signal Sub-Section
    - 8th AA Sub-Gun Operations Room Mixed Signal Sub-Section
    - 36th AA Brigade Signal Office Mixed Sub-Section
    - 203rd RAF Fighter Sector Sub-Section
    - 341st AA Gun Operations Room Mixed Signal Section
    - 8th AA Line Maintenance Section
  - HQ No 2 Company
    - 51st AA Brigade Signal Office Mixed Sub-Section
    - 210th RAF Fighter Sector Sub-Section
    - 343rd AA Gun Operations Room Mixed Signal Section
    - 52nd AA Brigade Signal Office Mixed Sub-Section
    - 204th RAF Fighter Sector Sub-Section
    - 336th AA Gun Operations Room Mixed Signal Section
    - 3342nd AA Gun Operations Room Mixed Signal Section
    - 340th AA Gun Operations Room Mixed Signal Section
    - 9th AA Line Maintenance Section
- HQ 3rd AA Div RASC
  - 192nd, 255th Companies
- 3rd AA Div Workshop Company, RAOC
- 3rd AA Div Radio Maintenance Company, RAOC

The RAOC companies became part of the new Royal Electrical and Mechanical Engineers (REME) during 1942.

== Disbandment ==
In August 1942, the Divisional HQ moved south to join I AA Corps and assist in controlling the large number of AA units brought in to defend against Luftwaffe 'hit and run' attacks on the South Coast of England. It was given control of the 27th (Home Counties), 47th and 64th AA Brigades, but this lasted only for a short time, because AA Command underwent a major reorganisation at the end of September 1942, resulting in the disbandment of all the AA Divisional HQs. In October 1942, the 3rd and 12th AA Divisional Signals re-merged to form the 6th AA Group Signals.

== General Officers Commanding ==
The commanders of the 3rd AA Division were as follows:

- Major-General Lancelot Hickes, from formation until 23 September 1939
- Major-General Leslie Hill, 24 September 1939 – 13 August 1940
- Major-General Hugh Martin, 14 August–10 November 1940 (promoted to command III AA Corps)
- Major-General John Younger, 15 November 1940 (from the 4th AA Division) to 7 January 1942 (posted to Washington)
- Major-General William Wyndham Green, DSO, MC*, 7 January 1942 until disbandment (posted to the 5th AA Group)

== See also ==
- List of British divisions in World War II
- Structure of the British Army in 1939

== External sources ==
- British Generals of WWII at Generals.dk.
- Anti-Aircraft Command (1939) at British Military History
- Orders of Battle at Patriot Files
- The Royal Artillery 1939–45
