= Anti-Aircraft Command =

British Army organization in World War II

- Active: 1 April 1939 – 10 March 1955
- Country: United Kingdom
- Branch: British Army
- Type: Command
- Role: Ground Based Air Defence
- Garrison/HQ: Bentley Priory
- Engagements: Battle of Britain; The Blitz; Baedeker Raids; Baby Blitz; Operation Diver

Commanders
- Notable commanders: Lt-Gen Alan Brooke; Lt-Gen Sir Frederick Pile

Anti-Aircraft Command (AA Command, or "Ack-Ack Command") was a British Army command of the Second World War that controlled the Territorial Army anti-aircraft artillery and searchlight formations and units defending the United Kingdom.

== Origin ==
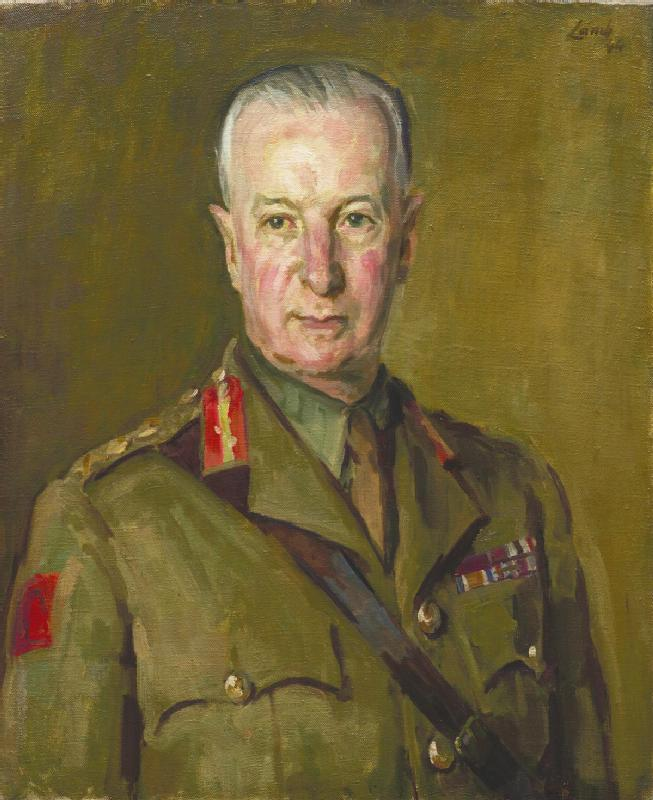
Sir Frederick Pile, GOCinC, AA Command, during the Second World War

The formation of a Command-level body of anti-aircraft defences had been announced in 1938, but Anti-Aircraft Command was not formed until 1 April 1939 under General Sir Alan Brooke, who had been commander of Anti-Aircraft Corps. He then passed control to Sir Frederick Pile, who remained in command until the end of the war.

AA Command was under the operational direction of RAF Fighter Command as part of Air Defence of Great Britain, and occupied a headquarters known as Glenthorn in the grounds of Bentley Priory, home of Fighter Command.

The majority of AA Command's guns and searchlights were operated by Territorial Army units. Some Regular Army units joined after they returned from the Dunkirk evacuation. Later, as the war progressed, Regulars and TA were freed up for overseas service by the use of men of the Home Guard (loading and firing the guns) and women of the Auxiliary Territorial Service (handling ammunition and operating gun directors).

== Organisation ==
=== Divisional ===
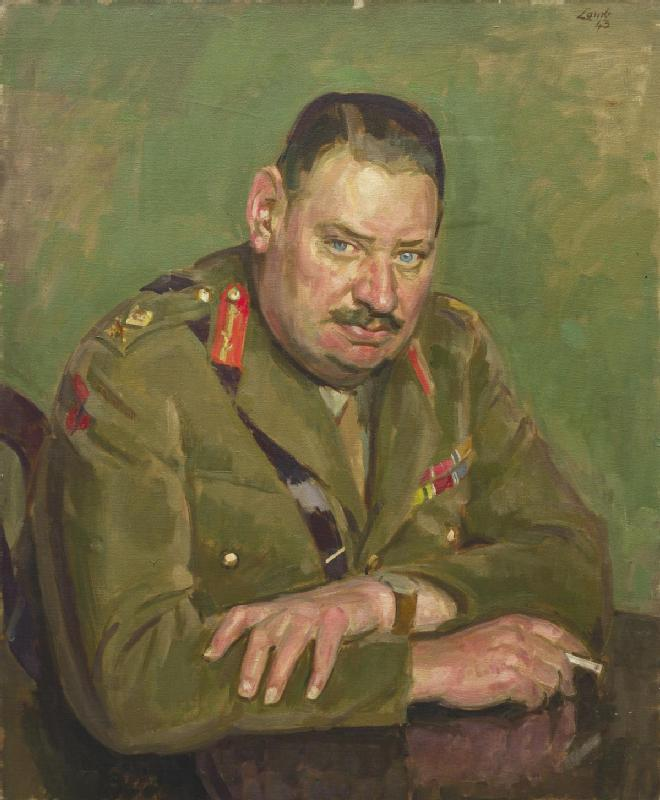
Maj-Gen Robert Whittaker, GOC 1st AA Division 1940–42, MGGS at AA Command HQ 1942–44.

Divisions under the command were:

- 1st Anti-Aircraft Division – Existing division at start of the war, headquartered in Uxbridge.
- 2nd Anti-Aircraft Division – Existing division at the start of the war, headquartered at RAF Hucknall, Nottinghamshire.
- 3rd Anti-Aircraft Division – Existing division at the start of the war, headquartered in Edinburgh.
- 4th Anti-Aircraft Division – Existing division at the start of the war, headquartered in Chester.
- 5th Anti-Aircraft Division – Existing division at the start of the war, headquartered in Reading.
- 6th Anti-Aircraft Division – Existing division at the start of the war, headquartered in Uxbridge.
- 7th Anti-Aircraft Division – Existing division at the start of the war, headquartered in Newcastle upon Tyne.
- 8th Anti-Aircraft Division – Formed November 1940 covering South West England, headquartered in Bristol.
- 9th Anti-Aircraft Division – Formed November 1940 covering South Wales, headquartered in Cardiff.
- 10th Anti-Aircraft Division – Formed November 1940 covering Yorkshire and the Humber Estuary.
- 11th Anti-Aircraft Division – Formed November 1940 covering the West and Central Midlands.
- 12th Anti-Aircraft Division – Formed November 1940 covering southwestern Scotland.

AA Command was also responsible for the Orkney and Shetland Defences (OSDEF).

=== Corps ===
At the end of 1940, the Command created three Corps to supervise this expanding organisation:

- I Anti-Aircraft Corps covering the South (1, 5, 6, 8 and 9 AA Divisions) corresponding with 10 and 11 Groups RAF
- II Anti-Aircraft Corps covering the Midlands (2, 4, 10 and 11 AA Divisions) corresponding with 9 and 12 Groups RAF
- III Anti-Aircraft Corps covering the North (3, 7 and 12 AA Divisions, and OSDEF) corresponding with 13 and 14 Groups RAF

=== Groups ===
In October 1942, the corps and divisions were abolished and replaced by seven flexible AA Groups more closely aligned with the operational structure of Fighter Command:

- 1st Anti-Aircraft Group covering London
- 2nd Anti-Aircraft Group covering the Solent, South-East England and southern East Anglia

(1st and 2nd AA Groups coincided with No. 11 Group RAF)

- 3rd Anti-Aircraft Group covering South-West England and South Wales (coinciding with No. 10 Group RAF)
- 4th Anti-Aircraft Group covering North Wales and North-West England (coinciding with No. 9 Group RAF)
- 5th Anti-Aircraft Group covering northern East Anglia and the East Coast as far as Scarborough, North Yorkshire (coinciding with No. 12 Group RAF)
- 6th Anti-Aircraft Group covering North-East England and Scotland (coinciding with No. 13 Group RAF (except Northern Ireland) and No. 14 Group RAF)
- 7th Anti-Aircraft Group covering Northern Ireland
- the Orkney and Shetland Defences remained separate

== Later events ==
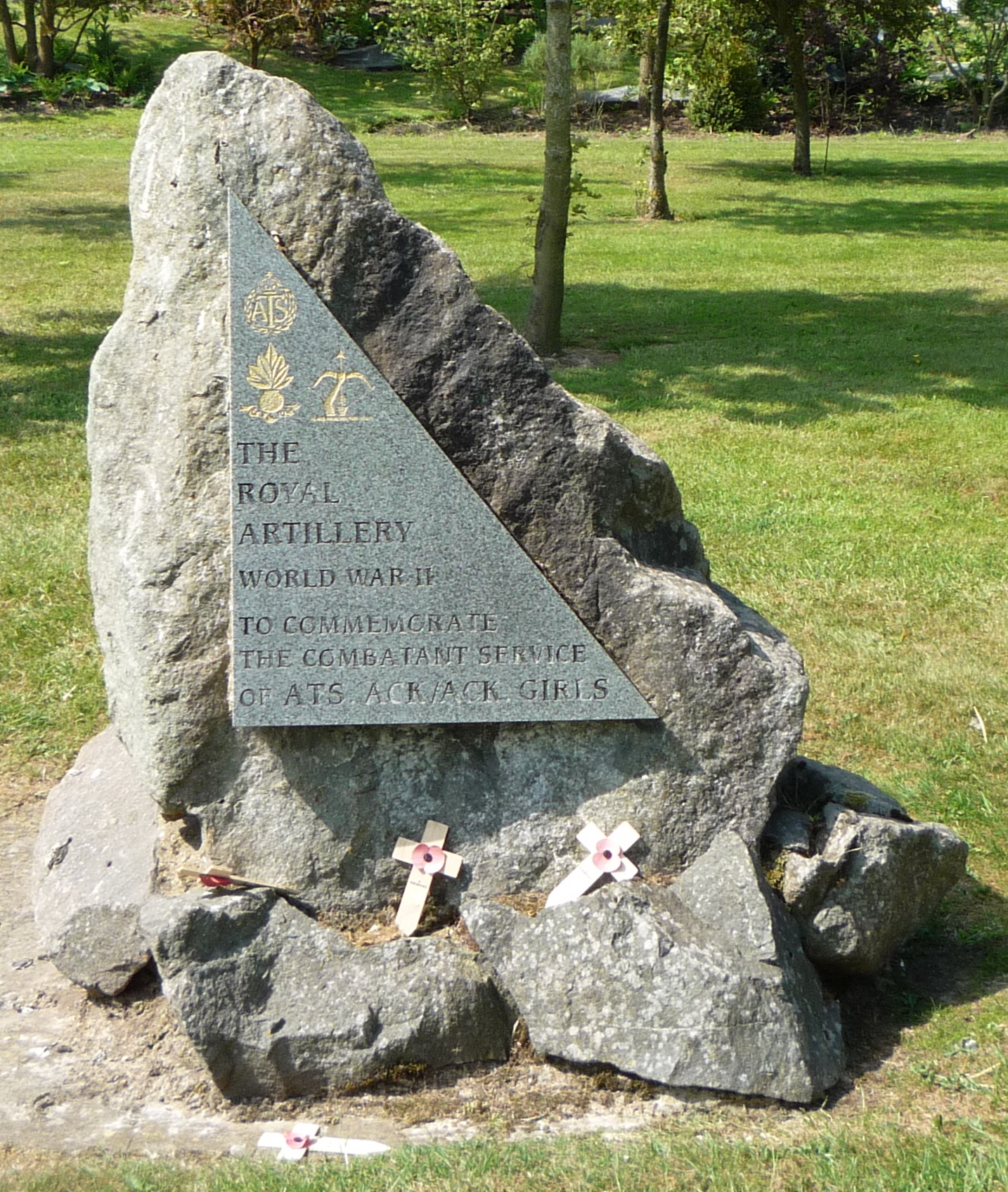
ATS 'Ack-Ack Girls' memorial at the National Memorial Arboretum. The badges depicted are those of the Auxiliary Territorial Service, Royal Artillery and AA Command.

Later, the 6th AA Group took over the Solent area to cover the preparations for Operation Overlord and was replaced in NE England by a new 8th Anti-Aircraft Group.

A new 9th Anti-Aircraft Group was formed to cover southern East Anglia during the flying bomb offensive (Operation Diver).

On 1 April 1943, AA Command took over control of smoke screens from the Ministry of Home Security. These installations were manned by the Pioneer Corps.

In November 1944, the 3rd, 4th and 7th Anti-Aircraft Groups were disbanded, with the areas covered by the 2nd and 5th Anti-Aircraft Groups extended.

== Postwar ==
When the TA was reformed after the Second World War in 1947, AA Command was generously provided for, with a large number of units, some of them including members of the Women's Royal Army Corps (successors of the ATS). It was structured in five regional AA Groups, each commanding a number of TA and Regular AA Brigades:

- 1st AA Group – London
- 2nd AA Group – Aldershot
- 3rd AA Group – Edinburgh
- 4th AA Group – Warrington
- 5th AA Group – Nottingham

On 1 December 1954, it was announced that AA Command would be disbanded with effect from 10 March 1955.

== Senior staff ==
The following officers held senior posts in AA Command:

=== General Officers Commanding-in-Chief ===
- Lieutenant-General Alan Brooke (1 April – 28 July 1939; GOC AA Corps 15 July 1938 – 31 March 1939)
- Lieutenant-General Sir Frederick Pile (12 October 1939 – 14 April 1945)
- Lieutenant-General Sir William Green (15 April 1945 – 30 April 1946)
- Lieutenant-General Otto Lund (1 May 1946 – May 1948)
- Lieutenant-General Sir Ivor Thomas (May 1948 – 27 May 1950)
- Lieutenant-General Charles Loewen (28 May 1950 – 16 April 1953)
- Lieutenant-General Sir Maurice Chilton (17 April 1953 – 15 May 1955)

=== Major-General, General Staff ===
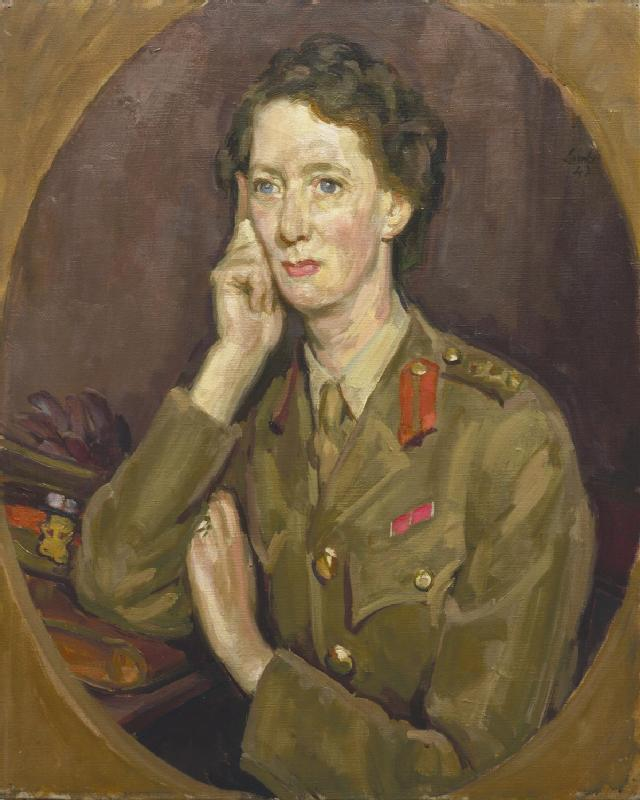
Senior Controller Christian Fraser-Tytler, DDATS at AA Command HQ from 1943.

- Major-General Thomas Newton (8 May 1939 – 31 December 1941)
- Major-General Robert Whittaker (1 January 1942 – 21 February 1944
- Major-General Frank Lejeune (22 February 1944 – 22 May 1944)
- Major-General Stephen Lamplugh (19 June 1944 – 24 June 1945)

=== Brigadier, General Staff ===
- Brigadier B. P. Hughes (1 October 1942 – 1943)
- Brigadier Stephen Lamplugh (25 June 1945 – 30 July 1946)
- Brigadier Geoffrey Thompson (1 July 1946 – 31 December 1946)

=== Chief of Staff ===
- Brigadier Geoffrey Thompson (1 January 1947 – April 1948)

=== Deputy Director, Auxiliary Territorial Service ===
- Controller V. P. Farrow (12 May – 14 October 1942)
- Controller The Hon. Lady M. Lawrence (15 October 1942 – 27 June 1943)
- Senior Controller Christian Fraser-Tytler (28 June 1943 – 1944/45)

== See also ==
- Balloon Command
- Bomber Command
- Fighter Command
- 7th Air Defence Group – current successor organisation to AA Command
- Army Air Defense Command (United States) - successive US organizations, named Army Antiaircraft Command 1950–1957
