= Structure of the British Army in 1939 =

In September 1939, the British Army was in process of expanding their anti-aircraft and mobile (including armoured) assets. Among these new changes was the formation of Anti-Aircraft Command which was formed on 1 April 1939, and the 1st Armoured Division formed in 1937. The list below will include the British Army units, colonial units, and those units which were in the process of formation.

The list includes units which were in the process of formation, cadre sized, or had no units attached. Also included are Territorial Army (TA) and Supplementary Reserve (SR) units.

== War Office ==
The War Office or WO as it was abbreviated, was the Army ministry of the British Government which controlled the British Army and associated forces not under the Colonial Office.

- Secretary of State for War, The Right Honourable Leslie Hore-Belisha, MP (holding the office from 28 May 1937 – 5 January 1940)
  - Army Council, Secretary of State for War held the office of President of the Army Council, this council was made up of 7 other members
  - Department of the Parliamentary Under-Secretary of State for War
  - Department of the Permanent Under-Secretary of State for War
  - Department of the Financial Secretary of the War Office
  - Department of the Director-General of the Territorial Army
  - Military Attaches to Embassies Legations to Foreign Courts
  - British Military Mission to the Egyptian Army
  - British Military Mission to the Iraq Army
  - Department of the Chief-of-Staff of the Imperial General Staff
  - Department of the Quartermaster General to the Forces
  - Department of the Adjutant General to the Forces
  - Office of the Judge Advocate General to the Forces
  - Selection Board
  - Officer Training Corps
  - Inspectors-General
  - Elements of the Department of the Director General of Munitions Production, had been transferred to the Ministry of Supply on 1 August 1939.

== Aldershot Command ==
Aldershot Command's geographical area encompassed portions of the following counties Berkshire, Hampshire, Surrey, Sussex. Its primary formations on the outbreak of the war were:

- 1st Army Tank Brigade
- 1st Anti-Aircraft Brigade
- 1st Infantry Division
- 2nd Infantry Division

== Northern Command ==
Northern Command
Headquartered at York, covering the areas of: Berwick-upon-Tweed (except regulars), Northumberland, County Durham, Yorkshire, Lincolnshire, Rutlandshire, Leicestershire, Nottinghamshire, and Derbyshire.

- General Officer Commanding-in-Chief, Northern Command: General Sir William 'Barty' Henry Bartholomew
- Northern Command Pay Section, Royal Army Pay Corps, Imphal Barracks
- Air Formation Signals, Royal Corps of Signals (SR), Leeds
  - 1st (West Riding) Signal Company, Royal Corps of Signals, Leeds
  - 3rd (West Riding) Signal Company, Royal Corps of Signals, Leeds
  - 5th Signal Company, Royal Corps of Signals, Bradford
- Northern Command Signal Company, Royal Corps of Signals, York
- 4th Artillery Signal Section, Royal Corps of Signals, Catterick Camp
- 7th Tank Signal Section, Royal Corps of Signals, Catterick Camp
- Signals Training Centre, Royal Corps of Signals, Catterick Camp
- Training Battalion, Royal Corps of Signals, Catterick Camp
- 1st Battalion, Alexandra, Princess of Wales's Own North Yorkshire Regiment (The Green Howards), Catterick Camp (attached to 13th Inf Bde for Admin)
- Royal Irish Fusiliers Depot, Catterick Camp (temporary)
- Railway Operating Group, Royal Engineers (SR), Leeds
  - 153rd (London and North Eastern) Railway Operating Company, Royal Engineers, Cambridge
  - 155th (London, Midland, and Scottish) Railway Workshop, Royal Engineers, Derby
- 1st Docks Group, Royal Engineers (SR), York
- 2nd Docks Group, Royal Engineers (SR), Crewe
- 106th (West Riding) Army Troop Company, Royal Engineers (SR), Doncaster
- 107th (North Riding) Army Troops Company, Royal Engineers (SR), Middlesbrough
- 150th (London and North Eastern) Railway Construction, Royal Engineers (SR), Cambridge
- 15th Company, Royal Army Service Corps, Imphal Barracks
- 28th Company, Royal Army Service Corps, Catterick Camp
- H Company, Royal Army Service Corps, Catterick Camp
- 9th Section, Royal Army Ordnance Corps, Catterick Camp
- 13th Section, Royal Army Ordnance Corps, Chetwynd Barracks
- 8th Company, Royal Army Medical Corps, York
- Detachment, Royal Army Veterinary Corps, Catterick Camp
- Detachment, Royal Army Veterinary Corps, Imphal Barracks
- Section, Corps of Military Police, Claro Barracks
- Section, Corps of Military Police, Uniacke Barracks
- Royal Artillery Fixed Defences, Northern Ports
  - Royal Artillery Coast Defences, Northern Command, Tynemouth Castle
  - Humber Fire Command, Hedon
  - Tees and Hartlepool Fire Command, Hartlepool
  - Tynemouth Fire Command, Tynemouth

=== 5th Infantry Division ===
- Headquarters, 5th Infantry Division commanded by Major General Harold Edmund Franklyn, Catterick Camp
  - 5th Infantry Divisional Signals, Royal Corps of Signals, Catterick Camp (cadre)
  - 5th Infantry Divisional Royal Army Ordnance Corps, Catterick Camp
  - 5th Company, Corps of Military Police, Catterick Camp
  - 13th Infantry Brigade
    - Headquarters 13th Infantry Brigade & Signal Section, Royal Corps of Signals, Catterick Camp
    - 2nd Battalion, Princess Victoria's Royal Irish Fusiliers
    - 2nd Battalion, The Duke of Edinburgh's Wiltshire Regiment
    - 2nd Battalion, The Scottish Rifles (Cameronians)
    - 13th Infantry Brigade Anti-Tank Company
  - 15th Infantry Brigade
    - Headquarters 15th Infantry Brigade & Signal Section, Royal Corps of Signals, Catterick Camp
    - 1st Battalion, The King's Own South Yorkshire Light Infantry, Queen Elizabeth Barracks, Strensall
    - 1st Battalion, The York and Lancaster Regiment
    - 2nd Battalion, The Duke of Albany's Seaforth Highlanders (The Ross-shire Buffs), Glasgow
    - 15th Infantry Brigade Anti-Tank Company
  - Divisional Royal Artillery (cadre)
  - Divisional Royal Engineers (cadre)
    - 55th Field Company, Royal Engineers, Catterick
  - Divisional Royal Army Service Corps
    - Headquarters, Divisional Royal Army Service Corps, Catterick Camp
    - 19th Company, Royal Army Service Corps
    - 34th Company, Royal Army Service Corps
    - 51st Company, Royal Army Service Corps

=== Northumbrian Area ===
Northumbrian Area, Darlington: comprising the counties of Northumberland, County Durham, North Riding of Yorkshire (excluding Catterick Area and Strensall Camp), East Riding of Yorkshire; also Berwick-upon-Tweed (except regulars).

- Northumbrian Area Commander: Colonel P. J. Sears
- Northumberland Hussars (TA), Newcastle upon Tyne
- 1st East Riding of Yorkshire Yeomanry (TA), Kingston upon Hull
- 2nd East Riding of Yorkshire Yeomanry (2/TA), Kingston upon Hull
- 7th Battalion, Royal Northumberland Fusiliers (2/TA), Alnwick, machine-gun
- 9th Battalion, Royal Northumberland Fusiliers (2/TA), Alnwick, machine-gun
- 4th (Durham) Survey Regiment, Royal Artillery (TA), Gateshead-on-Tyne
- 6th Survey Regiment, Royal Artillery (2/TA), Gateshead-on-Tyne
- 37th (Tyne Electrical Engineers) Light Anti-Aircraft Regiment, Royal Artillery (TA), Tynemouth, not batteries constituted until 1940
- 123rd Light Anti-Aircraft Battery, Royal Artillery, RAF Croft
- 127th Light Anti-Aircraft Battery, Royal Artillery, RAF Croft
- 234th (Northumbrian) Field Company, Royal Engineers (TA), Gateshead-on-Tyne
- 506th Field Company, Royal Engineers (TA), Gateshead-on-Tyne
- Royal Northumberland Fusiliers Depot, Newcastle upon Tyne
- East Yorkshire Regiment Depot, Beverley
- Green Howards Depot, Richmond
- Durham Light Infantry Depot, Newcastle upon Tyne
- 25th Army Tank Brigade (TA)
  - 25th Army Tank Brigade Headquarters, Newcastle upon Tyne
  - 43rd (6th (City) Battalion, The Royal Northumberland Fusiliers) Royal Tank Regiment, Newcastle upon Tyne
  - 49th Royal Tank Regiment, Newcastle upon Tyne
  - 51st (Leeds Rifles) Royal Tank Regiment, Leeds
- Northumbrian Area Coastal Defences
  - Tynemouth Heavy Coastal Regiment, Royal Artillery (TA), Blyth
  - East Riding Heavy Coastal Regiment, Royal Artillery (TA), Kingston upon Hull
  - Durham Heavy Coastal Regiment, Royal Artillery (TA), Hartlepool
  - Tyne Fortress Engineers, Royal Engineers (TA), Tynemouth
  - North Riding Fortress Engineers, Royal Engineers (TA), Middlesbrough
  - East Riding Fortress Engineers, Royal Engineers (TA), Kingston upon Hull

==== 23rd (Northumbrian) Division (2/TA) ====
- 23rd (Northumbrian) Division, Darlington
  - Headquarters, 23rd (Northumbrian) Division, commanded by Major General William Norman Herbert
  - 23rd (Northumbrian) Divisional Signals, Royal Corps of Signals, Darlington
  - 8th Battalion, The Royal Northumberland Fusiliers, Prudhoe, motorcycle reconnaissance
  - 23rd Infantry Divisional Royal Army Service Corps, Darlington
  - 23rd Infantry Divisional Royal Army Ordnance Corps, Darlington
  - 23rd Infantry Divisional Royal Army Medical Corps, Darlington
  - 23rd Infantry Divisional Military Police Company, Corps of Military Police, Darlington
  - 69th Infantry Brigade
    - Headquarters, 69th Infantry Brigade & Signal Section, Royal Corps of Signals, Malton
    - 5th Battalion, The Duke of York's Own East Yorkshire Regiment, Kingston upon Hull
    - 6th Battalion, Alexandra, Princess of Wales's Own (North) Yorkshire Regiment (Green Howards), Richmond
    - 7th Battalion, Alexandra, Princess of Wales's Own (North) Yorkshire Regiment (Green Howards), Scarborough
  - 70th Infantry Brigade
    - Headquarters, 70th Infantry Brigade & Signal Section, Royal Corps of Signals, Durham
    - 10th Battalion, The Durham Light Infantry, Bishop Auckland
    - 11th Battalion, The Durham Light Infantry, Sunderland
    - 12th (Tynside Scottish) Battalion, The Durham Light Infantry, Gateshead-on-Tyne
  - Divisional Royal Artillery
    - Headquarters, Divisional Royal Artillery, Darlington
    - 124th (Northumbrian) Field Regiment, Royal Artillery, Newcastle upon Tyne
    - 125th (Northumbrian) Field Regiment, Royal Artillery, Sunderland
  - Divisional Royal Engineers
    - Headquarters, Divisional Royal Engineers, Newcastle upon Tyne
    - 233rd (Northumbrian) Field Company, Royal Engineers, Jarrow-on-Tyne
    - 507th Field Company, Royal Engineers, Newcastle upon Tyne
    - 508th Field Company, Royal Engineers, Newcastle upon Tyne

==== 50th (Northumbrian) Motor Division (TA) ====
- 50th (Northumbrian) Motor Division, Darlington
  - Headquarters, 50th Motor Division, commanded by Major General Sir Giffard Le Quesne Martel
  - 50th (Northumbrian) Divisional Signals, Royal Corps of Signals, Darlington
  - 4th Battalion, The Royal Northumberland Fusiliers, Alnwick, motorcycle reconnaissance
  - 50th Infantry Divisional Royal Army Service Corps, Darlington
  - 50th Infantry Divisional Royal Army Ordnance Corps, Darlington
  - 149th (Northumbrian) Field Ambulance, Royal Army Medical Corps, Darlington
  - 150th (Northumbrian) Field Ambulance, Royal Army Medical Corps, Darlington
  - 151st (Northumbrian) Field Ambulance, Royal Army Medical Corps, Darlington
  - 50th Infantry Divisional Military Police Company, Corps of Military Police, Darlington
  - 150th Infantry Brigade
    - Headquarters, 150th Infantry Brigade & Signal Section, Royal Corps of Signals, Malton
    - 4th Battalion, The Duke of York's Own East Yorkshire Regiment, Kingston upon Hull
    - 4th Battalion, Alexandra, Princess of Wales's Own (North) Yorkshire Regiment (Green Howards), Richmond
    - 5th Battalion, Alexandra, Princess of Wales's Own (North) Yorkshire Regiment (Green Howards), Scarborough
  - 151st Infantry Brigade
    - Headquarters, 151st Infantry Brigade & Signal Section, Royal Corps of Signals, Durham
    - 6th Battalion, The Durham Light Infantry, Bishop Auckland
    - 8th Battalion, The Durham Light Infantry, Sunderland
    - 9th Battalion, The Durham Light Infantry, Gateshead-on-Tyne
  - Divisional Royal Artillery
    - Headquarters, Divisional Royal Artillery, Darlington
    - 72nd (Northumbrian) Field Regiment, Royal Artillery, Newcastle upon Tyne
    - 74th (Northumbrian) Field Regiment, Royal Artillery, South Shields
  - Divisional Royal Engineers
    - Headquarters, Divisional Royal Engineers, Newcastle upon Tyne
    - 232nd (Northumbrian) Field Company, Royal Engineers, Newcastle upon Tyne
    - 505th Field Company, Royal Engineers, Newcastle upon Tyne
    - 235th (Northumbrian) Field Park Company, Royal Engineers, Gateshead-on-Tyne

=== West Riding Area ===
West Riding Area: York, covering West Riding of Yorkshire, County Borough of York, Strensall Camp, Lincolnshire, Rutlandshire, Leicestershire, Nottinghamshire, and Derbyshire.

- Headquarters West Riding Area, York under Area Commander Brigadier Richard Montague Wootten
- West Riding Area Signal Section, Royal Corps of Signals, York
- Leicestershire Yeomanry (TA), Derby
- 1st Derbyshire Yeomanry (TA), Derby
- 2nd Derbyshire Yeomanry (TA), Derby
- 60th (North Midland) Field Regiment, Royal Artillery (TA), Lincoln
- 115th (North Midland) Field Regiment, Royal Artillery (2/TA), Leicester
- 107th (South Nottinghamshire Hussars Yeomanry) Field Regiment, Royal Horse Artillery (TA), Nottingham
- 150th (South Nottinghamshire Hussars) Field Regiment, Royal Horse Artillery (2/TA), Nottingham
- 27th Light Anti-Aircraft Regiment, Royal Artillery, Newark-on-Trent
- 38th Light Anti-Aircraft Regiment, Royal Artillery, Bradford
- 39th Light Anti-Aircraft Regiment, Royal Artillery, Lincoln
- 52nd Light Anti-Aircraft Battery, Royal Artillery, Thorncliffe
- 106th Light Anti-Aircraft Battery, Royal Artillery, RAF Waddington
- 109th Light Anti-Aircraft Battery, Royal Artillery, RAF Hemswell
- 126th Light Anti-Aircraft Battery, Royal Artillery, RAF Coal Aston
- 53rd (King's Own Yorkshire Light Infantry) Light Anti-Aircraft Regiment, Royal Artillery (TA), Doncaster
- 57th (King's Own Yorkshire Light Infantry) Light Anti-Aircraft Regiment, Royal Artillery (2/TA), Doncaster
- 1st Field Artillery Depot, Harrogate
- 4th Infantry Training Group, Ripon
- Lincolnshire Regiment Depot, Lincoln
- West Yorkshire Regiment Depot, York
- Leicestershire Regiment Depot, Leicester
- The Duke of Wellington's Regiment Depot, Halifax
- Nottinghamshire and Derbyshire Regiment (Sherwood Foresters) Depot, Derby
- King's Own (South) Yorkshire Light Infantry Depot, Pontefract
- York and Lancaster Regiment Depot, Pontefract
- Anti-Aircraft Training Depot, Royal Corps of Signals, Harrogate
- Training Depot, Royal Engineers, Ripon
- 5th Cavalry Brigade (TA), Bootham
  - Headquarters, 5th Cavalry Brigade
  - The Queen's Own (South) Yorkshire Dragoons, Doncaster
  - Alexandra, Princess of Wales's Own (North) Yorkshire Hussars, York
  - Nottinghamshire Yeomanry (Sherwood Rangers), Nottingham

==== 46th Infantry Division (2/TA) ====
- 46th Infantry Division, York
  - Headquarters 46th Infantry Division commanded by Major General Algeron Lee Ransome
  - 46th Infantry Divisional Signals, Royal Corps of Signals, Leeds
  - 46th Infantry Divisional Royal Army Service Corps, York
  - 46th Infantry Divisional Royal Army Ordnance Corps, York
  - 46th Infantry Divisional Royal Army Medical Corps, York
  - 46th Infantry Divisional Military Police Company, Corps of Military Police, York
  - 137th Infantry Brigade
    - Headquarters 137th Infantry Brigade & Signal Section, Royal Corps of Signals, Leeds
    - 2/5th Battalion, The Prince of Wales's Own West Yorkshire Regiment, York
    - 2/6th Battalion, The Duke of Wellington's West Riding Regiment, Scarborough
    - 2/7th Battalion, The Duke of Wellington's West Riding Regiment, Milnsbridge
  - 138th Infantry Brigade
    - Headquarters 138th Infantry Brigade & Signal Section, Royal Corps of Signals, Wakefield
    - 6th Battalion, The Lincolnshire Regiment, Lincoln
    - 2/4th Battalion, The King's Own (South Yorkshire) Light Infantry, Wakefield
    - 6th Battalion, The York and Lancaster Regiment, Sheffield
  - 139th Infantry Brigade
    - Headquarters 139th Infantry Brigade & Signal Section, Royal Corps of Signals, Leicester
    - 2/5th Battalion, The Leicestershire Regiment, Leicester
    - 2/5th Battalion, The Nottinghamshire and Derbyshire Regiment (The Sherwood Foresters), Derby
    - 9th Battalion, The Nottinghamshire and Derbyshire Regiment (The Sherwood Foresters), Newark-on-Trent
  - Divisional Royal Artillery 46th Division
    - Headquarters, Divisional Royal Artillery, York
    - 121st Field Regiment, Royal Artillery, Leeds
    - 122nd Field Regiment, Royal Artillery, Halifax
    - 123rd Field Regiment, Royal Artillery, Sheffield
    - 68th Anti-Tank Regiment, Royal Artillery, Bridlington
  - Divisional Royal Engineers 46th Division
    - Headquarters, Divisional Royal Engineers, Sheffield
    - 270th Field Company, Royal Engineers, Sheffield
    - 271st Field Company, Royal Engineers, Sheffield
    - 272nd Field Company, Royal Engineers, Sheffield
    - 273rd Field Park Company, Royal Engineers, Sheffield

==== 49th (West Riding) Infantry Division (TA) ====
- 49th (West Riding) Infantry Division, Clifton
  - Headquarters, 49th Infantry Division commanded by Major General Pierse Joseph Mackesy
  - 49th (West Riding) Divisional Signals, Royal Corps of Signals, Leeds
  - 49th Infantry Divisional Royal Army Service Corps, Clifton
  - 49th Infantry Divisional Royal Army Ordnance Corps, Clifton
  - 49th Infantry Divisional Royal Army Medical Corps, Clifton
  - 49th Infantry Divisional Military Police Company, Corps of Military Police, Clifton
  - 146th Infantry Brigade
    - Headquarters 146th Infantry Brigade & Signal Section, Royal Corps of Signals, Doncaster
    - 4th Battalion, The Lincolnshire Regiment, Lincoln
    - 1/4th Battalion, The King's Own (South) Yorkshire Light Infantry, Wakefield
    - The Hallamshire Battalion, The York and Lancaster Regiment, Sheffield
  - 147th Infantry Brigade
    - Headquarters 147th Infantry Brigade & Signal Section, Royal Corps of Signals, Rastrick
    - 1/5th Battalion, The Prince of Wales's Own West Yorkshire Regiment, York
    - 1/6th Battalion, The Duke of Wellington's West Riding Regiment, Scarborough
    - 1/7th Battalion, The Duke of Wellington's West Riding Regiment, Milnsbridge
  - 148th Infantry Brigade
    - Headquarters 148th Infantry Brigade & Signal Section, Royal Corps of Signals, Nottingham
    - 1/5th Battalion, The Leicestershire Regiment, Leicester
    - 1/5th Battalion, The Nottinghamshire and Derbyshire Regiment (The Sherwood Foresters), Derby
    - 8th Battalion, The Nottinghamshire and Derbyshire Regiment (The Sherwood Foresters), Newark-on-Trent
  - Divisional Royal Artillery 49th Division
    - Headquarters, Divisional Royal Artillery, York
    - 69th (West Riding) Field Regiment, Royal Artillery, Leeds
    - 70th (West Riding) Field Regiment, Royal Artillery, Halifax
    - 71st (West Riding) Field Regiment, Royal Artillery, Sheffield
    - 58th (Duke of Wellington's Regiment) Anti-Tank Regiment, Royal Artillery, Bridlington
  - Divisional Royal Engineers 49th Division
    - Headquarters, Divisional Royal Engineers, Sheffield
    - 228th (West Riding) Field Company, Royal Engineers, Sheffield
    - 229th (West Riding) Field Company, Royal Engineers, Sheffield
    - 230th (West Riding) Field Company, Royal Engineers, Sheffield
    - 231st (West Riding) Field Park Company, Royal Engineers, Sheffield

== Scottish Command ==
Scottish Command, Edinburgh covered Scotland and Berwick-upon-Tweed (so far as regards Regulars and Militia only).

- Headquarters Scottish Command, Edinburgh under General Officer Commanding-in-Chief, Scottish Command: General Sir Charles John Cecil Grant
- Scottish Command Pay Detachment, Royal Army Pay Corps, Edinburgh
- Scottish Command Pay Detachment, Royal Army Pay Corps, Leith and Edinburgh
- Scottish Command Pay Detachment, Royal Army Pay Corps, Perth
- Scottish Command Signal Company, Royal Corps of Signals, Edinburgh
- General Headquarters Signals, Royal Corps of Signals (SR), Glasgow
  - 1st General Headquarters Signal Company, Royal Corps of Signals, Glasgow
  - 3rd General Headquarters Signal Company, Royal Corps of Signals, Edinburgh
- 2nd Battalion, The Royal Scots Fusiliers, Edinburgh
- 1st Battalion, The City of Glasgow Regiment (Highland Light Infantry), Fort George
- 12th Field Regiment, Royal Artillery, Dunbar
- Detachment, The Survey Battalion, Royal Engineers, Edinburgh
- 103rd (Glasgow) Army Troops Company, Royal Engineers (SR), Glasgow
- 109th (Glasgow) Workshop and Park Company, Royal Engineers (SR), Glasgow
- 11th Section, Royal Army Ordnance Corps, Stirling
- 13th Company, Royal Army Medical Corps, Edinburgh
- Royal Artillery Fixed Defences, Scottish Ports
  - Headquarters, Scottish Coastal Defences, Leith
  - Forth Fire Command, Leith
  - Clyde Fire Command, Gourock
  - Orkneys Fire Command, Orkney

=== Highland Area ===
Highland Area, Perth: covering the counties of Sutherland, Caithness, Ross and Cromarty, Inverness-shire, Nairnshire, Morayshire, Banffshire, Aberdeenshire, Kincardineshire, Angus, Perthshire, Kinross-shire, Fife, Clackmannanshire, Stirlingshire, Dunbartonshire, Renfrewshire, Buteshire, and Argyllshire.

- Headquarters, Highland Area, Perth
- Lovat Scouts (TA), Inverness
- Scottish Horse (TA), Dunkeld
- 1st Fife and Forfar Yeomanry (TA), Kirkcaldy
- 2nd Fife and Forfar Yeomanry (2/TA), Dundee
- 4th (The City of Aberdeen) Battalion, Gordon Highlanders (TA), Aberdeen, machine-gun
- 8th (The City of Aberdeen) Battalion, Gordon Highlanders (2/TA), Aberdeen, machine-gun
- 5th (Renfrewshire) Battalion, The Argyll and Sutherland Highlanders (TA), Paisley
- 6th (Renfrewshire) Battalion, The Argyll and Sutherland Highlanders (TA), Paisley
- 56th (Highland) Medium Regiment, Royal Artillery (TA), Aberdeen
- 65th (Highland) Medium Regiment, Royal Artillery (TA), Fraserborough
- 54th (Argyll and Sutherland Highlanders) Light Anti-Aircraft Regiment, Royal Artillery (TA), Dumbarton Castle
- 58th (Argyll and Sutherland Highlanders) Light Anti-Aircraft Regiment, Royal Artillery (2/TA), Clydebank
- 100th Light Anti-Aircraft Battery, Royal Artillery (TA), RAF Montrose
- 102nd Light Anti-Aircraft Battery, Royal Artillery (TA), RAF Donibristle
- 104th Light Anti-Aircraft Battery, Royal Artillery (TA), RAF Stranraer
- 105th Light Anti-Aircraft Battery, Royal Artillery (TA), Scapa Flow
- Orkneys Heavy Regiment, Royal Artillery (TA)
- Fife Heavy Regiment, Royal Artillery (TA)
- Orkneys Fortress Engineers, Royal Engineers (TA)
- The Royal Highland Regiment (The Black Watch) Depot, Perth
- The Duke of Albany's Seaforth Highlanders (The Ross-shire Buffs) Depot, Fort George
- Gordon Highlanders Depot, Aberdeen
- The Queen's Own Cameron Highlanders Depot, Inverness
- The Argyll and Sutherland Highlanders (Princess Louise's) Depot, Stirling

==== 9th (Highland) Infantry Division ====
- Headquarters, 9th (Highland) Division commanded by Major General George Mackintosh Lindsay, Perth
  - 9th (Scottish) Divisional Signals, Royal Corps of Signals, Perth
  - 9th Infantry Divisional Royal Army Service Corps, Perth
  - 9th Infantry Divisional Royal Army Ordnance Corps, Perth
  - 9th Infantry Divisional Royal Army Medical Corps, Perth
  - 9th Infantry Divisional Military Police Company, Corps of Military Police, Perth
  - 26th Infantry Brigade
    - Headquarters, 26th Infantry Brigade & Signal Section, Royal Corps of Signals, Inverness
    - 5th (Sutherland and Caithness) Battalion, The Duke of Albany's Seaforth Highlanders (The Ross-shire Buffs), Golspie
    - 7th (Morayshire) Battalion, The Duke of Albany's Seaforth Highlanders (The Ross-shire Buffs), Elgin
    - 5th Battalion, The Queen's Own Cameron Highlanders, Inverness
  - 27th Infantry Brigade
    - Headquarters, 27th Infantry Brigade & Signal Section, Royal Corps of Signals, Aberdeen
    - 5th (Angus and Dundee) Battalion, The Royal Highland Regiment (The Black Watch), Dundee
    - 7th (Mars and Mearns) Battalion, Gordon Highlanders, Tarves
    - 9th (Donside) Battalion, Gordon Highlanders, Aberdeen
  - 28th Infantry Brigade
    - Headquarters, 28th Infantry Brigade & Signal Section, Royal Corps of Signals, Stirling
    - 7th (Fife) Battalion, The Royal Highland Regiment (The Black Watch), St Andrews
    - 10th Battalion, Princess Louises's Argyll and Sutherland Highlanders, Stirling
    - 11th (Argyll and Dumbarton) Battalion, Princess Louises's Argyll and Sutherland Highlanders, Oban
  - Divisional Royal Artillery 9th Division
    - Headquarters, Divisional Royal Artillery, Perth
    - 126th (Highland) Field Regiment, Royal Artillery, Aberdeen
    - 127th (Highland) Field Regiment, Royal Artillery, Dundee
    - 128th (Highland) Field Regiment, Royal Artillery, Renfrew
    - 61st (West Highland) Anti-Tank Regiment, Royal Artillery, Rothesay
  - Divisional Royal Engineers 9th Division
    - Headquarters, Divisional Royal Engineers, Aberdeen
    - 274th Field Company, Royal Engineers, Alness
    - 275th Field Company, Royal Engineers, Stromness
    - 276th Field Company, Royal Engineers, Paisley
    - 277th Field Park Company, Royal Engineers, Dundee

==== 51st (Highland) Infantry Division (TA) ====
- 51st (Highland) Infantry Division, Perth
  - Headquarters, 51st (Highland) Infantry Division commanded by Major General Victor Morven Fortune
  - 51st (Highland) Divisional Signals, Royal Corps of Signals, Aberdeen
  - 51st Infantry Divisional Royal Army Service Corps, Perth
  - 51st Infantry Divisional Royal Army Ordnance Corps, Perth
  - 51st Infantry Divisional Royal Army Medical Corps, Perth
  - 51st Infantry Divisional Military Police Company, Corps of Military Police, Perth
  - 152nd (Highland) Infantry Brigade
    - Headquarters, 152nd Infantry Brigade & Signal Section, Royal Corps of Signals, Inverness
    - 4th (Ross-shire) Battalion, The Duke of Albany's Seaforth Highlanders (The Ross-shire Buffs), Golspie
    - 6th (Morayshire) Battalion, The Duke of Albany's Seaforth Highlanders (The Ross-shire Buffs), Elgin
    - 4th Battalion, The Queen's Own Cameron Highlanders, Inverness
  - 153rd (Highland) Infantry Brigade
    - Headquarters, 153rd Infantry Brigade & Signal Section, Royal Corps of Signals, Aberdeen
    - 4th (City of Dundee) Battalion, The Royal Highland Regiment (The Black Watch), Dundee
    - 5th (Buchan and Formartin) Battalion, Gordon Highlanders, Tarves
    - 6th (Banffshire) Battalion, Gordon Highlanders, Aberdeen
  - 154th (Highland) Infantry Brigade
    - Headquarters, 154th Infantry Brigade & Signal Section, Royal Corps of Signals, Stirling
    - 6th (Perthshire) Battalion, The Royal Highland Regiment (The Black Watch), St Andrews
    - 7th Battalion, Princess Louises's Argyll and Sutherland Highlanders, Stirling
    - 8th (Argyllshire) Battalion, Princess Louises's Argyll and Sutherland Highlanders, Oban
  - Divisional Royal Artillery 51st Division
    - Headquarters, Divisional Royal Artillery, Perth
    - 75th (Highland) Field Regiment, Royal Artillery, Aberdeen
    - 76th (Highland) Field Regiment, Royal Artillery, Dundee
    - 77th (Highland) Field Regiment, Royal Artillery, Renfrew
    - 51st (West Highland) Anti-Tank Regiment, Royal Artillery, Rothesay
  - Divisional Royal Engineers 51st Division
    - Headquarters, Divisional Royal Engineers, Aberdeen
    - 236th (City of Aberdeen) Field Company, Royal Engineers, Aberdeen
    - 237th (City of Dundee) Field Company, Royal Engineers, Dundee
    - 238th (County of Renfrewshire) Field Company, Royal Engineers, Renfrew
    - 239th (City of Aberdeen) Field Company, Royal Engineers, Aberdeen

=== Lowland Area ===
Lowland Area, Darlington: comprising the counties of West Lothian, Midlothian, East Lothian, Berwickshire (including Berwick-upon-Tweed for Regulars and Militia only), Roxburghshire, Dumfriesshire, Kirkcudbrightshire, Wigtownshire, Ayrshire, Lanarkshire, Peeblesshire, Selkirkshire; and (for Clyde and Forth Defences only), and Fife.

- Headquarters, Lowland Area in Darlington
- The Earl of Carrick's Own Ayrshire Yeomanry (TA), Ayr
- Lanarkshire Yeomanry (TA), Lanark
- 1st Lothians and Border Horse (TA), Edinburgh
- 2nd Lothians and Border Horse (2/TA), Ladybank
- 57th (Lowland) Medium Regiment, Royal Artillery (TA), Edinburgh
- 66th (Lowland) Medium Regiment, Royal Artillery (TA), Prestonpans
- The Royal Scots (Lothian Regiment) Depot, Milton Bridge
- Royal Scots Fusiliers Depot, Ayr
- The King's Own Scottish Borderers Depot, Berwick-upon-Tweed
- The Scottish Rifles (Cameronians) Depot, Hamilton
- The City of Glasgow Regiment (Highland Light Infantry) Depot, Glasgow
- 14th Searchlight Depot, Royal Artillery (SR), Troon
- Lowland Coast Defences
  - Forth Heavy Regiment, Royal Artillery (TA), Edinburgh
  - Clyde Heavy Regiment, Royal Artillery (TA), Port Glasgow
  - City of Edinburgh Fortress Engineers, Royal Engineers (TA), Edinburgh
  - Renfrewshire Fortress Engineer, Royal Engineers (TA), Greenock

==== 15th (Scottish) Infantry Division ====
- 15th (Scottish) Infantry Division, Glasgow
  - Headquarters, 52nd (Lowland) Infantry Division commanded by Major General Roland Le Fanu
  - 15th Divisional Signals, Royal Corps of Signals, Glasgow
  - 15th Infantry Divisional Royal Army Service Corps, Glasgow
  - 15th Infantry Divisional Royal Army Ordnance Corps, Glasgow
  - 15th Infantry Divisional Royal Army Medical Corps, Glasgow
  - 15th Infantry Divisional Military Police Company, Corps of Military Police, Glasgow
  - 44th Infantry Brigade
    - Headquarters, 155th Infantry Brigade & Signal Section, Royal Corps of Signals, Edinburgh
    - 8th (Lothians and Peeblesshire) Battalion, The Royal Scots (Royal Lothian Regiment), Leith
    - 6th (The Border), The King's Own Scottish Borderers, Galashiels
    - 7th (Galloway) Battalion, The King's Own Scottish Borderers, Dumfries
  - 45th Infantry Brigade
    - Headquarters, 156th Infantry Brigade & Signal Section, Royal Corps of Signals, Glasgow
    - 6th Battalion, The Royal Scots Fusiliers, Kilmarnock
    - 9th Battalion, The Scottish Rifles (Cameronians), Hamilton
    - 10th (Lanarkshire) Battalion, The Scottish Rifles (Cameronians), Glasgow
  - 46th Infantry Brigade
    - Headquarters, 157th Infantry Brigade & Signal Section, Royal Corps of Signals, Glasgow
    - 10th Battalion, The City of Glasgow Regiment (Highland Light Infantry), Glasgow
    - 11th Battalion, The City of Glasgow Regiment (Highland Light Infantry), Glasgow
    - 2nd Battalion, The Glasgow Highlanders, Glasgow
  - Divisional Royal Artillery
    - Divisional Royal Artillery, Glasgow
    - 129th Field Regiment, Royal Artillery, Edinburgh
    - 130th Field Regiment, Royal Artillery, Ayr
    - 131st Field Regiment, Royal Artillery, Glasgow
    - 64th Anti-Tank Regiment, Royal Artillery, Glasgow
  - Divisional Royal Engineers
    - Headquarters, Divisional Royal Engineers, Baillieston
    - 278th Field Company, Royal Engineers, Coatbridge
    - 279th Field Company, Royal Engineers, Motherwell
    - 280th Field Company, Royal Engineers, Rutherglen
    - 281st Field Company, Royal Engineers, Rutherglen

==== 52nd (Lowland) Infantry Division (TA) ====
- 52nd (Lowland) Infantry Division, Glasgow
  - Headquarters, 52nd (Lowland) Infantry Division commanded by Major General James Syme Drew
  - 52nd (Lowland) Infantry Divisional Signals, Royal Corps of Signals, Glasgow
  - 52nd Infantry Divisional Royal Army Service Corps, Glasgow
  - 52nd Infantry Divisional Royal Army Ordnance Corps, Glasgow
  - 52nd Infantry Divisional Royal Army Medical Corps, Glasgow
  - 52nd Infantry Divisional Military Police Company, Corps of Military Police, Glasgow
  - 155th (South Scottish) Infantry Brigade, Edinburgh
    - Headquarters, 155th Infantry Brigade & Signal Section, Royal Corps of Signals
    - 7th/9th (Highlanders) Battalion, The Royal Scots (Royal Lothian Regiment), Leith
    - 4th (The Border) Battalion, The King's Own Scottish Borderers, Galashiels
    - 5th (Dumfrieshire) Battalion, The King's Own Scottish Borderers, Dumfries
  - 156th (Scottish Rifles) Infantry Brigade, Glasgow
    - Headquarters, 156th Infantry Brigade & Signal Section, Royal Corps of Signals
    - 4th/5th Battalion, The Royal Scots Fusiliers, Kilmarnock
    - 6th (Lanarkshire) Battalion, The Scottish Rifles (Cameronians), Hamilton
    - 7th Battalion, The Scottish Rifles (Cameronians), Glasgow
  - 157th (Highland Light Infantry) Infantry Brigade, Glasgow
    - Headquarters, 157th Infantry Brigade & Signal Section, Royal Corps of Signals
    - 5th (City of Glasgow) Battalion, The City of Glasgow Regiment (Highland Light Infantry), Glasgow
    - 6th (City of Glasgow) Battalion, The City of Glasgow Regiment (Highland Light Infantry), Glasgow
    - 1st Battalion, The Glasgow Highlanders, Glasgow
  - Divisional Royal Artillery
    - Divisional Royal Artillery, Glasgow
    - 78th (Lowland) Field Regiment, Royal Artillery, Edinburgh
    - 79th (Lowland) Field Regiment, Royal Artillery, Ayr
    - 80th (Lowland - City of Glasgow) Field Regiment, Royal Artillery, Glasgow
    - 54th (The Queen's Own Royal Glasgow Yeomanry) Anti-Tank Regiment, Royal Artillery, Glasgow
  - Divisional Royal Engineers
    - Divisional Royal Engineers, Rutherglen
    - 240th (Lowland) Field Company, Royal Engineers, Coatbridge
    - 241st (Lowland) Field Company, Royal Engineers, Motherwell
    - 242nd (Lowland) Field Company, Royal Engineers, Rutherglen
    - 243rd (Lowland) Field Park Company, Royal Engineers, Rutherglen

== Eastern Command ==
Eastern Command was one of two southern commands, itself overseeing the areas of: Cambridgeshire, Norfolk, Suffolk, Essex (except Purfleet and Rainham rifle ranges; and (when occupied by Foot Guards) the Guards' barracks at Warley Barracks), Hertfordshire, Bedfordshire, Middlesex, Kent, Sussex, and Surrey (less portion in the Aldershot Command and London District), and Woolwich Garrison (exclusive of the Territorial Army troops quartered there).

- Headquarters, Eastern Command, Cavalry Barracks, Hounslow commanded by Lieutenant General Sir Guy Williams
- Eastern Command Pay Detachment, Royal Army Pay Corps, Barnet
- Eastern Command Pay Detachment, Royal Army Pay Corps, Canterbury
- Eastern Command Pay Detachment, Royal Army Pay Corps, Chatham
- Eastern Command Pay Detachment, Royal Army Pay Corps, Foots Cray
- Eastern Command Pay Detachment, Royal Army Pay Corps, Hounslow
- Eastern Command Pay Detachment, Royal Army Pay Corps, Warley
- Eastern Command Pay Detachment, Royal Army Pay Corps, London
- Eastern Command Signal Company, Royal Corps of Signals, London
- 8th Artillery Signal Section, Royal Corps of Signals, Canterbury
- 10th Artillery Signal Section, Royal Corps of Signals, Canterbury
- 13th Artillery Signal Section, Royal Corps of Signals, Canterbury
- Signal Experimental Establishment, Royal Corps of Signals, Woolwich
- 5th Construction Signal Section, Royal Corps of Signals (SR), Ravenscourt Park
- 1st Line Signal Section, Royal Corps of Signals (SR), Guildford
- 2nd Line Signal Section, Royal Corps of Signals (SR), Guildford
- 17th/21st Lancers, Colchester
- 2nd Battalion, The Essex Regiment, Warley Barracks
- 1st Infantry Training Group, Colchester
- 2nd Infantry Training Group, Lydd
- 27th Field Regiment, Royal Artillery, Colchester
- 32nd Field Regiment, Royal Artillery, Preston Barracks
- 5th Medium Regiment, Royal Artillery, Royal Artillery School of Gunnery
- 2nd Heavy Regiment, Royal Artillery, Royal Artillery School of Gunnery
- The Riding Establishment, Royal Artillery, St John's Wood
- Detachment from The Survey Battalion, Royal Engineers, London
- 108th (Essex) Electrical and Mechanical Company, Royal Engineers (SR), Chelmsford
- Royal Army Service Corps Driving School, Feltham Barracks
- 2nd Company, Royal Army Service Corps, Woolwich Garrison
- 18th Company, Royal Army Service Corps, Kitchener Barracks
- 22nd Company, Royal Army Service Corps, Shorncliffe Army Camp
- 37th Company, Royal Army Service Corps, Woolwich Garrison
- 38th Company, Royal Army Service Corps, Woolwich Garrison
- 45th Company, Royal Army Service Corps, Woolwich Garrison
- 46th Company, Royal Army Service Corps, Shorncliffe Army Camp
- 57th Company, Royal Army Service Corps, Colchester Garrison
- 59th Company, Royal Army Service Corps, Colchester Garrison
- 60th Company, Royal Army Service Corps, Woolwich Garrison
- F Company, Royal Army Service Corps, Woolwich Garrison
- Maintenance Stores Depot, Royal Army Service Corps, Feltham Barracks
- Heavy Maintenance Repair Shop, Royal Army Service Corps, Feltham Barracks
- Vehicle Reserve Depot, Royal Army Service Corps, Feltham Barracks
- Non-combatant Labour Corps Depot, Colchester
- 7th Section, Royal Army Ordnance Corps, Dover
- 8th Section, Royal Army Ordnance Corps, Colchester
- 9th Company, Royal Army Medical Corps, Colchester
- 10th Company, Royal Army Medical Corps, Shorncliffe
- 12th Company, Royal Army Medical Corps, Woolwich
- 18th Company, Royal Army Medical Corps, Millbank Barracks
- Veterinary Platoon, Royal Army Veterinary Corps, Woolwich
- Veterinary Platoon, Royal Army Veterinary Corps, Colchester
- Veterinary Platoon, Royal Army Veterinary Corps, Shorncliffe
- Veterinary Platoon, Royal Army Veterinary Corps, Dover
- 1st Veterinary Depot, Royal Army Veterinary Corps, Woolwich
- Section, Corps of Military Police, Colchester Garrison
- Section, Corps of Military Police, Shorncliffe Army Camp
- Section, Corps of Military Police, Shorncliffe Army Camp
- Section, Corps of Military Police, Dover
- Section, Corps of Military Police, Kitchener Barracks
- Section, Corps of Military Police, Woolwich Garrison
- Section, Corps of Military Police, Woolwich Garrison
- Eastern Command Coastal Artillery
  - Headquarters, Royal Artillery Fixed Defences, Eastern Ports, Sheerness Dockyard
  - Dover Fire Command, Royal Navy Dockyard
  - Thames Fire Command, Shoeburyness
  - Medway Fire Command, Sheerness Dockyard
  - Harwich Fire Command, Port of Felixstowe

=== 4th Infantry Division ===
- 4th Infantry Division, Colchester Garrison
  - Headquarters, 4th Infantry Division commanded by Major General Dudley Graham Johnson
  - 4th Infantry Divisional Signals, Royal Corps of Signals, Colchester
  - 5th Royal Inniskilling Dragoon Guards, Colchester, divisional reconnaissance
  - 2nd Battalion, The Royal Northumberland Fusiliers, Colchester, divisional machine-gun battalion
  - 4th Infantry Divisional Royal Army Ordnance Corps, Colchester Garrison
  - 4th Infantry Divisional Royal Army Medical Corps, Colchester Garrison
  - 10th Infantry Brigade
    - Headquarters, 10th Infantry Brigade & Signal Section, Royal Corps of Signals, Shorncliffe Army Camp
    - 2nd Battalion, The Bedfordshire and Hertfordshire Regiment, Milton Barracks
    - 2nd Battalion, The Duke of Cornwall's Light Infantry
    - 1st Battalion, The Queen's Own Royal West Kent Regiment
    - 10th Infantry Brigade Anti-Tank Company
  - 11th Infantry Brigade
    - Headquarters, 11th Infantry Brigade & Signal Section, Royal Corps of Signals, Colchester Garrison
    - 2nd Battalion, The Lancashire Fusiliers
    - 1st Battalion, The East Surrey Regiment
    - 1st Battalion, The Oxfordshire and Buckinghamshire Light Infantry
    - 11th Infantry Brigade Anti-Tank Company
  - 12th Infantry Brigade
    - Headquarters, 12th Infantry Brigade & Signal Section, Royal Corps of Signals, Dover Western Heights
    - 2nd Battalion, The City of London Regiment (Royal Fusiliers)
    - 1st Battalion, The Prince of Wales's South Lancashire Volunteers
    - 1st Battalion, The Royal Highland Regiment (The Black Watch)
    - 12th Infantry Brigade Anti-Tank Company
  - Divisional Royal Artillery
    - Headquarters, Divisional Royal Artillery, Colchester Garrison
    - 17th Field Regiment, Royal Artillery, Woolwich
    - 22nd Field Regiment, Royal Artillery, Shorncliffe Army Camp
    - 30th Field Regiment, Royal Artillery
    - 14th Anti-Tank Regiment, Royal Artillery
  - Divisional Royal Engineers
    - Headquarters, Divisional Royal Engineers, Shorncliffe Army Camp
    - 7th Field Company, Royal Engineers
    - 9th Field Company, Royal Engineers
    - 29th Field Company, Royal Engineers, Canterbury Barracks
    - 18th Field Park Company, Royal Engineers, Colchester Garrison
  - Divisional Royal Army Service Corps
    - Headquarters, Divisional Royal Army Service Corps, Colchester Garrison
    - 21st Company, Royal Army Service Corps
    - 44th Company, Royal Army Service Corps, Woolwich Garrison

=== East Anglian Area ===
East Anglian Area covered the counties of Cambridgeshire, Norfolk, Suffolk, Essex, Middlesex, Hertfordshire, and Bedfordshire (less the following: Colchester Garrison, Purfleet Rifle Range, and Rainham rifle ranges (when occupied by the Foot Guards) the Guards' Barracks at Warley Barracks which area under London District, That partition of Essex in Chatham Area from Grays Thurrock Station along main road to Stanford-le-Hope, thence north side of railway via South Benfleet to Southend-on-Sea borough boundary - thence a line drawn north-east to Lower Edward's Hall - thence road eastwords to Harp House - thence a line south-east to Southchurch Lawn - thence a line due north to River Roach - thence along south bank of River Roach and south bank of River Crouch to Foulness Point).

- East Anglian Area Headquarters, The Barracks, Herford commanded by Area Commander Colonel W. P. Buckley
- 1/7th Battalion, The Duke of Cambridge's Own Middlesex Regiment, Hornsey
- 2/7th Battalion, The Duke of Cambridge's Own Middlesex Regiment, Southgate
- 1/8th Battalion, The Duke of Cambridge's Own Middlesex Regiment, Hounslow
- 2/8th Battalion, The Duke of Cambridge's Own Middlesex Regiment, Ruislip Manor
- Norfolk Regiment Depot, Britannia Barracks
- Suffolk Regiment Depot, Gibraltar Barracks
- Bedfordshire and Hertfordshire Regiment Depot, Kempston Barracks
- Essex Regiment Depot, Warley Barracks
- Middlesex Regiment Depot, Inglis Barracks
- 104th (Essex Yeomanry) Field Regiment, Royal Horse Artillery, Brentwood
- 147th (Essex Yeomanry) Field Regiment, Royal Artillery, Chelmsford
- 58th (Suffolk) Medium Regiment, Royal Artillery, Ipswich
- 67th (Suffolk) Medium Regiment, Royal Artillery, Bury St Edmunds
- Suffolk Heavy Regiment, Royal Artillery, Dovercourt
- 97th Light Anti-Aircraft Battery, Royal Artillery, RAF Hounslow
- 119th Light Anti-Aircraft Battery, Royal Artillery, RAF Westley
- 250th (East Anglian) Field Company, Royal Engineers, Cambridge
- Suffolk Fortress Engineers, Royal Engineers, Ipswich

==== 18th Infantry Division (2/TA) ====
- 18th (Eastern) Infantry Division, Hertford
  - Headquarters, 18th Infantry Division commanded by Major General Thomas Gerald Dalby
  - 18th (Eastern) Infantry Divisional Signals, Royal Corps of Signals, Stratford
  - 18th Infantry Divisional Royal Army Service Corps, Stratford
  - 18th Infantry Divisional Royal Army Ordnance Corps, Stratford
  - 18th Infantry Divisional Military Police Company, Corps of Military Police, Stratford
  - 54th Infantry Brigade
    - Headquarters, 54th Infantry Brigade & Signal Section, Royal Corps of Signals, Norwich
    - 4th Battalion, The Royal Norfolk Regiment, Norwich
    - 4th Battalion, The Suffolk Regiment, Ipswich
    - 5th Battalion, The Suffolk Regiment, Bury St Edmunds
  - 55th Infantry Brigade
    - Headquarters, 55th Infantry Brigade & Signal Section, Royal Corps of Signals, Bedford
    - 5th Battalion, The Bedfordshire and Hertfordshire Regiment, Bedford
    - 1st Battalion, The Cambridgeshire Regiment, Cambridge
    - 2nd Battalion, The Cambridgeshire Regiment, Wisbech
  - Divisional Royal Artillery
    - Headquarters, 18th Divisional Royal Artillery, The Barracks, Hertford
    - 105th (Bedfordshire Yeomanry) Field Regiment, Royal Artillery, Bedford
    - 135th Field Regiment, Royal Artillery, Hitchin
    - 148th Field Regiment, Royal Artillery, Luton
    - 65th (Norfolk Yeomanry) Anti-Tank Regiment, Royal Artillery, Swaffham
  - Divisional Royal Engineers
    - Headquarters, 18th Divisional Royal Engineers, Cambridge
    - 287th Field Company, Royal Engineers, Cambridge
    - 288th Field Company, Royal Engineers, Norwich
    - 251st (East Anglia) Field Park Company, Royal Engineers, Norwich

==== 54th (East Anglian) Infantry Division (TA) ====
- 54th (East Anglian) Infantry Division, Hertford
  - Headquarters, 54th Infantry Division commanded by Major General John Hedley Thornton Priestman
  - 54th (East Anglian) Infantry Divisional Signals, Royal Corps of Signals, Stratford
  - 54th Infantry Divisional Royal Army Service Corps, Hertford
  - 54th Infantry Divisional Royal Army Ordnance Corps, Hertford
  - 54th Infantry Divisional Royal Army Medical Corps, Hertford
  - 54th Infantry Divisional Military Police Company, Corps of Military Police, Hertford
  - 161st (Essex and London) Infantry Brigade
    - Headquarters, 161st Infantry Brigade & Signal Section, Royal Corps of Signals, Brentwood
    - 1/4th Battalion, The Essex Regiment, Chelmsford
    - 2/4th Battalion, The Essex Regiment, Ilford
    - 1/5th Battalion, The Essex Regiment, Braintree
    - 2/5th (East) Battalion, The Essex Regiment, Colchester
    - 5th (Hackney) Battalion, Princess Charlotte of Wales's Royal Berkshire Regiment, Hackney
    - 7th (Stoke Newington) Battalion, Princess Charlotte of Wales's Royal Berkshire Regiment, Stoke Newington
  - 162nd (East Midland) Infantry Brigade
    - Headquarters, 162nd Infantry Brigade & Signal Section, Royal Corps of Signals, Bedford
    - 6th Battalion, The Bedfordshire and Hertfordshire Regiment, Bedford
    - 1st Battalion, The Hertfordshire Regiment, Hertford
    - 2nd Battalion, The Hertfordshire Regiment, Hertford
  - 163rd (Norfolk) Infantry Brigade
    - Headquarters, 163rd Infantry Brigade & Signal Section, Royal Corps of Signals, Norwich
    - 5th Battalion, The Royal Norfolk Regiment, Dereham
    - 6th Battalion, The Royal Norfolk Regiment, Norwich
    - 7th Battalion, The Royal Norfolk Regiment, King's Lynn
  - Division Royal Artillery
    - Headquarters, Royal Artillery, The Barracks, Hertford
    - 85th (East Anglian) Field Regiment, Royal Artillery, Stratford
    - 86th (East Anglian) (Hertfordshire Yeomanry) Field Regiment, Royal Artillery, Hertford
    - 134th Field Regiment, Royal Artillery, Stratford
    - 55th (Suffolk Yeomanry) Anti-Tank Regiment, Royal Artillery, Bury St Edmunds
  - Divisional Royal Engineers
    - Headquarters, Royal Engineers, Bedford
    - 249th (East Anglia) Field Company, Royal Engineers, Luton
    - 286th Field Company, Royal Engineers, Bedford
    - 289th Field Park Company, Royal Engineers, Luton

=== Chatham Area ===
Chatham Area covered the areas of: Foulness Point (Essex) by a line drawn south to Shellness (Kent) thence a line drawn south-west to Ladydane thence along a road to Watling Street thence Watling Street to road Faversham, Leaveland, Challock Lees, Chaning, Lenham, Harrietsham, Elsfield, Hollingbourne thence Pilgrim's Way via Detling, Burham, Snodland thence via Pilgrim's Road to Trosley Towers thence along road Wrotham-Gravesent to Northumberland Bottom thence Watling Street to Southern Railway Bridge at Springhead thence northward along stream to River Thames, along south bank of River Thames to lighthouse on Swanscombe Marshes thence by a line drawn northeast across the River Thames to Grays Thurrock Station (Essex) thence along the main road to Stanford-le-Hope thence northside of railway via South Benfleet to Southend Borough boundary thence a line drawn northeast to lower Edward's Hull thence along road Eastwood to Harp House thence a line drawn south-east to Southchurch Lawn thence a line due north to River Roach, along south bank of River Roach and south bank of River Crouch to Foulness Point.

- Headquarters, Chatham Area, Kitchener Barracks under Area Commander Major General Ridley Pakenham Pakenham-Walsh
- Thames and Medway Heavy Regiment, Royal Artillery, Rochester
- Training Battalion, Royal Engineers, Royal School of Military Engineering
- Depot Battalion, Royal Engineers, Royal School of Military Engineering

=== Home Counties Area ===
Home Counties Area covered the areas of: Woolwich (exclusive of Territorial Army troops in London District), Counties of Kent (less areas in Chatham Area and the 4th Infantry Division stations of Dover, Shorncliffe, Hythe and Lydd), Sussex, Surrey (less the eastern boundaries of the parishes of Chobham, Horsell and Woking through Woking) including portions of the parishes of Stoke-next-Guildford, St. Nicholas, Arlington, to the west of the railway.

- Headquarters, Home Counties Area, Woolwich Station under Area Commanded Brigadier Alastair Ian Macdougall
- Queen's Royal West Surrey Regiment Depot, Stoughton Barracks
- Royal East Kent Regiment (Buffs) Depot, Canterbury Barracks
- City of London Regiment (Royal Fusiliers) Depot, Hounslow Barracks
- East Surrey Regiment Depot, The Barracks, Kingston upon Thames
- Royal Sussex Regiment Depot, The Barracks, Chichester
- Queen's Own Royal West Kent Regiment Depot, Maidstone Barracks
- 97th (Kent Yeomanry) Field Regiment, Royal Artillery (TA), Maidstone
- 98th (Surrey and Sussex Yeomanry, Queen Mary's) Field Regiment, Royal Artillery (TA), Clapham Park
- 143rd (Kent Yeomanry) Field Regiment, Royal Artillery (TA), Ashford
- 144th (Surrey and Sussex Yeomanry, Queen Mary's) Field Regiment, Royal Artillery (TA), Chichester
- Kent and Sussex Heavy Regiment, Royal Artillery (TA), Dover
- Royal Artillery Depot, Royal Artillery Barracks, Woolwich
- Kent Fortress Engineers, Royal Engineers (TA), Dover
- Cinque Ports Fortress Engineers, Royal Engineers (TA), Northfleet
- 21st Army Tank Brigade (TA), only part, other regiment under Southern Command
  - Headquarters, 21st Army Tank Brigade, Chipperfield
  - 42nd (7th (23rd London) Battalion, The East Surrey Regiment) Royal Tank Regiment, St John's Hill
  - 48th (2/7th (23rd London) Battalion, The East Surrey Regiment) Royal Tank Regiment, Clapham
  - 44th (6th Battalion, Gloucestershire Regiment) Royal Tank Regiment, Bristol

==== 12th (Eastern) Infantry Division ====
- 12th (Eastern) Infantry Division (TA), Royal Artillery Barracks, Woolwich
  - Headquarters, 12th Infantry Division commanded by Major General Roderic Loraine Petre
  - 12th (Eastern) Infantry Divisional Signals, Royal Corps of Signals, Stamford Brook
  - 12th Infantry Divisional Royal Army Service Corps, Stamford Brook
  - 12th Infantry Divisional Royal Army Ordnance Corps, Stamford Brook
  - 12th Infantry Divisional Royal Army Medical Corps, Stamford Brook
  - 12th Infantry Divisional Military Police Company, Corps of Military Police, Stamford Brook
  - 35th Infantry Brigade
    - Headquarters, 35th Infantry Brigade & Signal Section, Royal Corps of Signals, Caxton Street
    - 2/5th Battalion, The Queen's Royal West Surrey Regiment, Woking
    - 2/6th (Bermondsey) Battalion, The Queen's Royal West Surrey Regiment, Richmond
    - 2/7th (Southwark) Battalion, The Queen's Royal West Surrey Regiment, St George's Market
  - 36th Infantry Brigade
    - Headquarters, 36th Infantry & Signal Section, Royal Corps of Signals, Victoria Street
    - 2/6th Battalion, The East Surrey Regiment, Richmond
    - 6th Battalion, The Queen's Own Royal West Kent Regiment, St Mary Cray
    - 7th Battalion, The Queen's Own Royal West Kent Regiment, Dartford
  - 37th Infantry Brigade (Doubling as HQ Eastern Sub-Area)
    - Headquarters, 37th Infantry & Signal Section, Royal Corps of Signals
    - 5th Battalion, The Royal East Kent Regiment (Buffs), Canterbury
    - 6th Battalion, The Royal Sussex Regiment, Worthing
    - 7th (Cinque Ports) Battalion, The Royal Sussex Regiment, Brighton
  - Divisional Royal Artillery
    - Headquarters, Divisional Royal Artillery, Royal Artillery Barracks, Woolwich
    - 113th Field Regiment, Royal Artillery, Shoreham-by-Sea
    - 114th Field Regiment, Royal Artillery, Bexhill-on-Sea
    - 118th Field Regiment, Royal Artillery, Plumstead
    - 67th Anti-Tank Regiment, Royal Artillery, Sutton
  - Divisional Royal Engineers
    - Headquarters, Divisional Royal Engineers, Brighton
    - 262nd Field Company, Royal Engineers, Hastings
    - 263rd Field Company, Royal Engineers, Eastbourne
    - 264th Field Company, Royal Engineers, Lewes
    - 265th Field Park Company, Royal Engineers, Eastbourne

==== 44th (Home Counties) Infantry Division ====
- 44th (Home Counties) Infantry Division (TA)
  - Headquarters, 44th Infantry Division, Royal Artillery Barracks, Woolwich commanded by Major General Edmund Archibald Osborne
  - 44th (Home Counties) Divisional Signals, Royal Corps of Signals, Stamford Brook
  - 44th Infantry Divisional Royal Army Service Corps, Royal Artillery Barracks, Woolwich
  - 44th Infantry Divisional Royal Army Ordnance Corps, Royal Artillery Barracks, Woolwich
  - 44th Infantry Divisional Royal Army Medical Corps, Royal Artillery Barracks, Woolwich
  - 44th Infantry Divisional Military Police Company, Corps of Military Police, Royal Artillery Barracks, Woolwich
  - 131st (Surrey) Infantry Brigade (Doubling as HQ Western Sub-Area)
    - Headquarters, 131st Infantry & Signal Section, Royal Corps of Signals, Caxton Street
    - 1/5th Battalion, The Queen's Royal West Surrey Regiment, Guildford
    - 1/6th (Bermondsey) Battalion, The Queen's Royal West Surrey Regiment, Bermondsey
    - 1/7th (Southwark) Battalion, The Queen's Royal West Surrey Regiment, Walworth
  - 132nd Infantry Brigade (Doubling as HQ Central Sub-Area)
    - Headquarters, 132nd Infantry & Signal Section, Royal Corps of Signals, Victoria Street
    - 1/6th Battalion, The East Surrey Regiment, Surbiton
    - 4th Battalion, The Queen's Own Royal West Kent Regiment, Tonbridge
    - 5th Battalion, The Queen's Own Royal West Kent Regiment, Bromley
  - 133rd (Kent and Sussex) Infantry Brigade (Doubling as HQ Eastern Sub-Area)
    - Headquarters, 133rd Infantry & Signal Section, Royal Corps of Signals
    - 4th Battalion, The Royal East Kent Regiment (Buffs), Canterbury
    - 4th Battalion, The Royal Sussex Regiment, Horsham
    - 5th (Cinque Ports) Battalion, The Royal Sussex Regiment, Hastings
  - Divisional Royal Artillery
    - Headquarters, Divisional Royal Artillery, Royal Artillery Barracks, Woolwich
    - 57th (Home Counties) Field Regiment, Royal Artillery, Brighton
    - 58th (Sussex) Field Regiment, Royal Artillery, Eastbourne
    - 65th (8th London) Field Regiment, Royal Artillery, Lee Green
    - 57th (East Surrey) Anti-Tank Regiment, Royal Artillery, Wimbledon
  - Divisional Royal Engineers
    - Headquarters, Divisional Royal Engineers, Brighton
    - 208th (Sussex) Field Company, Royal Engineers, Eastbourne
    - 209th (Sussex) Field Company, Royal Engineers, Brighton
    - 210th (Sussex) Field Company, Royal Engineers, Seaford
    - 211th (Sussex) Field Company, Royal Engineers, Worthing

== Northern Ireland District ==
Northern Ireland District was one of two army districts, tasked with covering all of Northern Ireland.

- Headquarters, Northern Ireland District, Victoria Barracks under Major General Robert Valentine Pollock
- Northern Ireland District Pay Officer, Royal Army Pay Corps, Victoria Barracks
- Northern Ireland District Signal Company, Royal Corps of Signals, Victoria Barracks
- North Irish Horse (SR), Belfast
- 2nd Battalion, The South Wales Borderers, Ebrington Barracks
- 1st Battalion, The East Lancashire Regiment, Palace Barracks
- 2nd Battalion, The Northamptonshire Regiment, Abercorn Barracks
- 2nd Battalion, The Royal Sussex Regiment, Victoria Barracks
- Royal Inniskilling Fusiliers Depot, St Lucia Barracks
- Royal Ulster Rifles Depot, Gough Barracks
- Antrim Fortress Engineers, Royal Engineers (TA), Belfast
- 26th Company, Royal Army Service Corps, Victoria Barracks
- 53rd Company, Royal Army Service Corps, Victoria Barracks
- 54th Company, Royal Army Service Corps, Ebrington Barracks
- Northern Ireland District Section, Royal Army Ordnance Corps, Kinnegar Army Barracks
- 15th Company, Royal Army Medical Corps, Palace Barracks
- District Royal Artillery
  - Headquarters, Royal Artillery, Victoria Barracks
  - Belfast Fire Command, Belfast
  - 188th (Antrim) Independent Heavy Battery, Royal Artillery, Belfast
- 3rd (Northern Ireland) Anti-Aircraft Brigade (SR)
  - Headquarters, 3rd AA Brigade, Belfast
  - 3rd (Ulster) Searchlight Regiment, Royal Artillery, Belfast
  - 8th (Belfast) Anti-Aircraft Regiment, Royal Artillery, Belfast
  - 9th (Londonderry) Anti-Aircraft Regiment, Royal Artillery, Derry

== Western Command ==
Western Command was the largest command by area covered, including: Wales and the Counties of Cumberland, Westmorland, Lancashire, Staffordshire, Shropshire, Herefordshire, Cheshire, and Beachley, Gloucestershire and the Isle of Man.

- Headquarters, Western Command based at Dale Barracks 'The Dale' under Lieutenant General Robert Hadden Haining
- Western Command Pay Detachment, Royal Army Pay Corps, Chester
- Western Command Pay Detachment, Royal Army Pay Corps, Preston
- Western Command Pay Detachment, Royal Army Pay Corps, Shrewsbury
- Western Command Signals, Royal Corps of Signals, The Dale
- 1st (East Lancashire) Corps Medium Artillery Signal Section, Royal Corps of Signals (SR), Manchester
- 2nd Lines of Communications Signal Section, Royal Corps of Signals (SR), Manchester
- 3rd (West Lancashire) Lines of Communications Signal Section, Royal Corps of Signals (SR), Liverpool
- 2nd Battalion, The Royal East Kent Regiment (Buffs), Defensible Barracks
- 100th (Monmouthshire) Army Troops Company, Royal Engineers (SR), Monmouth Castle
- 101st (Monmouthshire) Army Troops Company, Royal Engineers (SR), Monmouth Castle
- 104th (East Lancashire) Army Troops Company, Royal Engineers (SR), Manchester
- 105th (West Lancashire) Army Troops Company, Royal Engineers (SR), Liverpool
- 154th (Great Western) Railway Operating Company, Royal Engineers (SR), Newport
- 16th Company, Royal Army Service Corps, Preston
- I Company, Royal Army Service Corps, Chester
- 10th Section, Royal Army Ordnance Corps, Burscough
- 19th Company, Royal Army Medical Corps, Warrington
- 2nd Anti-Aircraft Brigade
  - Headquarters, 2nd Anti-Aircraft Brigade, Lichfield
  - 2nd Anti-Aircraft Brigade Signals, Royal Corps of Signals, Blackdown
  - 1st Anti-Aircraft Regiment, Royal Artillery, Lichfield
  - 2nd Anti-Aircraft Regiment, Royal Artillery, Lichfield
- Royal Artillery Fixed Defences, North-Western Ports
  - Headquarters, Fixed Defences, Liverpool
  - Mersey Fire Command, Liverpool
- Royal Artillery Fixed Defences, Welsh Ports
  - Headquarters, Fixed Defences, Pembroke
  - Milford Haven Fire Command, Pembroke
  - Severn Fire Command, Barry Island

=== Welsh Area ===
Welsh Area covered Wales and the Countries of Shropshire and Herefordshire, and Beachley (Gloucestershire).

- Welsh Area Headquarters, Copthorne Barracks
- Shropshire Yeomanry (TA), Shrewsbury
- Royal Welch Fusiliers Depot, Hightown Barracks
- South Wales Borderers Depot, The Barracks, Brecon
- Welch Regiment Depot, Maindy Barracks
- King's Shropshire Light Infantry Depot, Copthorne Barracks
- 6th Medium Regiment, Royal Artillery,
- 69th (Caernarvon & Denbigh Yeomanry) Medium Regiment, Royal Artillery (TA), Bangor
- 70th (Royal Welch Fusiliers) Anti-Tank Regiment, Royal Artillery (TA), Mold
- 20th Light Anti-Aircraft Regiment, Royal Artillery (TA), Cardiff
- 3rd Field Depot, Royal Artillery, Park Hall Barracks
- 4th Field Depot, Royal Artillery, Kinmel Camp
- 10th Anti-Aircraft Depot, Royal Artillery, Park Hall Barracks
- 11th Anti-Aircraft Depot, Royal Artillery, Park Hall Barracks
- 15th Searchlight Depot, Royal Artillery, Park Hall Barracks
- 16th Searchlight Depot, Royal Artillery, Kinmel Camp
- 17th Searchlight Depot, Royal Artillery, RAF Credenhill
- 246th (Welsh) Field Company, Royal Engineers (TA), Cardiff
- Welsh Area Coast Defences
  - Glamorgan Heavy Regiment, Royal Artillery, Cardiff
  - Pembrokeshire Heavy Regiment, Royal Artillery, Milford Haven
  - Glamorgan Fortress Engineers, Royal Engineers, Cardiff
  - Carmarthenshire Fortress Engineers, Royal Engineers, Llanelli

==== 38th (Welsh) Infantry Division (2/TA) ====
- 38th (Welsh) Infantry Division, Shrewsbury
  - Headquarters, 38th Infantry Division commanded by Major General Geoffrey Taunton Raikes
  - 38th (Welsh) Divisional Signals, Royal Corps of Signals, Cardiff
  - 38th Infantry Divisional Royal Army Service Corps, Cardiff
  - 38th Infantry Divisional Royal Army Ordnance Corps, Shrewsbury
  - 38th Infantry Divisional Royal Army Medical Corps, Shrewsbury
  - 38th Infantry Divisional Military Police Company, Corps of Military Police, Shrewsbury
  - 113th (South Wales) Infantry Brigade
    - Headquarters, 113th Infantry Brigade & Signal Section, Royal Corps of Signals, Cardiff
    - 15th (Carmarthanshire) Battalion, The Welch Regiment, Llanelli
    - 2/5th Battalion, The Welch Regiment, Swansea
    - 4th Battalion, The Monmouthshire Regiment, Newport
  - 114th (Welsh Border) Infantry Brigade
    - Headquarters, 114th Infantry Brigade & Signal Section, Royal Corps of Signals, Newport
    - 5th Battalion, The King's Shropshire Light Infantry, Ross-on-Wye
    - The Brecknockshire Battalion, The South Wales Borderers, Brecon
    - 2nd Battalion, The Herefordshire Light Infantry, Hereford
  - 115th (Royal Welch Fusiliers) Brigade
    - Headquarters, 115th Infantry Brigade & Signal Section, Royal Corps of Signals, Wrexham
    - 8th Battalion, The Royal Welch Fusiliers, Wrexham
    - 9th Battalion, The Royal Welch Fusiliers, Conwy
    - 10th Battalion, The Royal Welch Fusiliers, Newtown
  - Divisional Royal Artillery
    - Headquarters, Divisional Royal Artillery, Shrewsbury
    - 102nd (Pembroke & Cardiganshire) Field Regiment, Royal Artillery, Pembroke Dock
    - 132nd Field Regiment, Royal Artillery, Neath
    - 146th Field Regiment, Royal Artillery, Aberystwyth
  - Divisional Royal Engineers
    - Headquarters, Divisional Royal Engineers, Cardiff
    - 283rd Field Company, Royal Engineers, Barry
    - 284th Field Company, Royal Engineers, Cardiff
    - 247th (Welsh) Field Park Company, Royal Engineers, Gorseinon

==== 53rd (Welsh) Infantry Division (1/TA) ====
- 53rd (Welsh) Infantry Division, Shrewsbury
  - Headquarters, 53rd Infantry Division commanded by Major General Bevil Thomson Wilson
  - 53rd (Welsh) Divisional Signals, Royal Corps of Signals, Cardiff
  - 53rd Infantry Divisional Royal Army Service Corps, Shrewsbury
  - 53rd Infantry Divisional Royal Army Ordnance Corps, Shrewsbury
  - 53rd Infantry Divisional Royal Army Medical Corps, Shrewsbury
  - 53rd Infantry Divisional Military Police Company, Corps of Military Police, Shrewsbury
  - 158th (Royal Welch Fusiliers) Infantry Brigade
    - Headquarters, 158th Infantry Brigade & Signal Section, Royal Corps of Signals, Wrexham
    - 4th (Denbigh) Battalion, The Royal Welch Fusiliers, Wrexham
    - 6th (Carnarvon and Angesley) Battalion, The Royal Welch Fusiliers, Caernarfon
    - 7th (Merioneth and Montgomery) Battalion, The Royal Welch Fusiliers, Newtown
  - 159th (Welsh Border) Infantry Brigade
    - Headquarters, 159th Infantry Brigade & Signal Section, Royal Corps of Signals, Newport
    - 4th Battalion, The King's Shropshire Light Infantry, Shrewsbury
    - 3rd Battalion, The Monmouthshire Regiment, Abergavenny
    - 1st Battalion, The Herefordshire Light Infantry, Hereford
  - 160th (South Wales) Infantry Brigade
    - Headquarters, 160th Infantry Brigade & Signal Section, Royal Corps of Signals, Cardiff
    - 4th (Llanelli) Battalion, The Welch Regiment, Llanelli
    - 1/5th (Glamorgan) Battalion, The Welch Regiment, Pontypridd
    - 2nd Battalion, The Monmouthshire Regiment, Pontypool
  - Divisional Royal Artillery
    - Headquarters, Divisional Royal Artillery, Shrewsbury
    - 81st (Welsh) Field Regiment, Royal Artillery, Port Talbot
    - 83rd (Welsh) Field Regiment, Royal Artillery, Newport
    - 133rd Field Regiment, Royal Artillery, Griffithstown
    - 60th (Royal Welch Fusiliers) Anti-Tank Regiment, Royal Artillery, Flint
  - Divisional Royal Engineers
    - Headquarters, Divisional Royal Engineers, Swansea
    - 244th (Welsh) Field Company, Royal Engineers, Swansea
    - 245th (Welsh) Field Company, Royal Engineers, Neath
    - 282nd Field Company, Royal Engineers, Port Talbot
    - 285th Field Park Company, Royal Engineers, Gorseinon

=== West Lancashire Area ===
West Lancashire encompassed: Lancashire, south and west of a line along the River Douglas and the Leeds-Liverpool Canal, South-East to Worsley, Cheshire, and Staffordshire.

- Headquarters, West Lancashire Area, Preston under Brigadier William Havelock Ramsden
- 4th Battalion, The Cheshire Regiment, Chester (TA), machine-gun battalion
- 5th (Earl of Chester's) Battalion, The Cheshire Regiment (TA), Knutsford, machine-gun battalion
- 6th Battalion, The Cheshire Regiment (TA), Stockport, machine-gun battalion
- 7th Battalion, The Cheshire Regiment (TA), Macclesfield, machine-gun battalion
- King's Liverpool Regiment Depot, Seaforth Barracks
- Cheshire Regiment Depot, Chester Castle
- South Staffordshire Regiment Depot, Whittington Barracks
- The Prince of Wales's South Lancashire Volunteers Depot, Peninsula Barracks
- The Prince of Wales's North Staffordshire Regiment Depot, Whittington Barracks
- 106th (Lancashire Hussars) Field Regiment, Royal Horse Artillery (TA), Liverpool
- 149th (Lancashire Hussars) Field Regiment, Royal Horse Artillery (TA), Hoylake
- 88th (2nd West Lancashire) Field Regiment, Royal Artillery (TA), Preston
- 137th (2nd West Lancashire) Field Regiment, Royal Artillery (TA), Blackpool
- 51st (Midland) Medium Regiment, Royal Artillery (TA), Stoke-on-Trent
- 59th (4th West Lancashire) Medium Regiment, Royal Artillery (TA), Liverpool
- 63rd (Midland) Medium Regiment, Royal Artillery (TA), Stoke-on-Trent
- 68th (4th West Lancashire) Medium Regiment, Royal Artillery (TA), Liverpool
- 135th Light Anti-Aircraft Battery, Royal Artillery (TA), Weaver Junction
- 12th Anti-Aircraft Depot, Royal Artillery, Saighton Camp
- 18th Searchlight Depot, Royal Artillery, Saighton Camp
- Mobile Divisional Royal Engineer
  - Headquarters, Mobile Divisional Royal Engineers, Liverpool
  - 2nd (Cheshire) Field Squadron, Royal Engineers, Birkenhead
  - 3rd (Cheshire) Field Squadron, Royal Engineers, Wallasey
  - 141st Field Park Troop, Royal Engineers, Liverpool
  - 142nd Field Park Troop, Royal Engineers, Liverpool
- 213th (North Midland) Army Field Company, Royal Engineers (TA), Cannock
- 214th (North Midland) Army Field Company, Royal Engineers (TA), Tunstall
- 252nd (West Lancashire) Field Company, Royal Engineers (TA), Walsall
- 253rd (West Lancashire) Field Company, Royal Engineers (TA), St Helens
- 254th (West Lancashire) Field Park Company, Royal Engineers (TA), Liverpool
- 290th Field Company, Royal Engineers (TA), Rowley Regis
- 291st Field Company, Royal Engineers (TA), Walsall
- 292nd Field Company, Royal Engineers (TA), The Potteries
- 293rd Field Park Company, Royal Engineers (TA), Stafford
- 6th Cavalry Brigade (TA)
  - Headquarters, 6th Cavalry Brigade, Leicester
  - The Earl of Chester's Cheshire Yeomanry, Chester
  - The Queen's Own Royal Staffordshire Yeomanry Regiment, Stafford
  - Warwickshire, Warwick
- 23rd Army Tank Brigade (2/TA)
  - Headquarters, 23rd Army Tank Brigade, Liverpool
  - 40th (The King's) Royal Tank Regiment, Liverpool
  - 46th (Liverpool Welsh) Royal Tank Regiment, Liverpool
  - 50th (2/6th Battalion Gloucestershire Regiment) Royal Tank Regiment, Bristol
- West Lancashire Area Coastal Defences
  - Lancashire and Cheshire Heavy Regiment, Royal Artillery (TA), Liverpool
  - Lancashire Fortress Engineers, Royal Engineers (TA), Liverpool

==== 55th (West Lancashire) Motor Division (TA) ====
- 55th (West Lancashire) Infantry Division, Liverpool
  - Headquarters, 55th Motor Division commanded by Major General Vivian Henry Bruce Majendie
  - 55th (West Lancashire) Divisional Signals, Royal Corps of Signals, Liverpool
  - 5th Battalion, The Loyal North Lancashire Regiment, Bolton, motorcycle reconnaissance
  - 55th Infantry Divisional Royal Army Service Corps, Liverpool
  - 55th Infantry Divisional Royal Army Ordnance Corps, Liverpool
  - 55th Infantry Divisional Royal Army Medical Corps, Liverpool
  - 55th Infantry Divisional Military Police Company, Corps of Military Police, Liverpool
  - 164th Infantry Brigade, all units motor infantry
    - Headquarters, 164th Infantry Brigade & Signal Section, Royal Corps of Signals, Warrington
    - 9th Battalion, The King's Liverpool Regiment, Liverpool
    - 1/4th Battalion, The Prince of Wales's South Lancashire Volunteers, Warrington
    - 2/4th Battalion, The Prince of Wales's South Lancashire Volunteers, Warrington
  - 165th Infantry Brigade, all units motor infantry
    - Headquarters, 165th Infantry Brigade & Signal Section, Royal Corps of Signals, Liverpool
    - 5th Battalion, The King's Liverpool Regiment, Liverpool
    - 1st Battalion, The Liverpool Scottish, Liverpool
    - 2nd Battalion, The Liverpool Scottish, Liverpool
  - Divisional Royal Artillery
    - Headquarters, Divisional Royal Artillery, Liverpool
    - 87th (1st West Lancashire) Field Regiment, Royal Artillery, Liverpool
    - 136th Field Regiment, Royal Artillery, Liverpool
    - 66th Anti-Tank Regiment, Royal Artillery, Crosby
  - Divisional Royal Engineers
    - Headquarters, Divisional Engineers, Aigburth
    - 509th Field Company, Royal Engineers, Liverpool
    - 510th Field Company, Royal Engineers, Liverpool
    - 511th Field Park Company, Royal Engineers, Liverpool

==== 59th (Staffordshire) Motor Division (2/TA) ====
- 59th (Staffordshire) Motor Division, Stafford
  - Headquarters, 59th Motor Division commanded by Major General John Blakiston-Houston
  - 59th (Staffordshire) Divisional Signals, Royal Corps of Signals, Stafford
  - 6th Battalion, The Loyal North Lancashire Regiment, Bolton, motorcycle reconnaissance
  - 59th Infantry Divisional Royal Army Service Corps, Stafford
  - 59th Infantry Divisional Royal Army Ordnance Corps, Stafford
  - 59th Infantry Divisional Royal Army Medical Corps, Stafford
  - 59th Infantry Divisional Military Police Company, Corps of Military Police, Stafford
  - 176th Infantry Brigade
    - Headquarters, 176th Infantry Brigade & Signal Section, Royal Corps of Signals, Burton upon Trent
    - 7th Battalion, The South Staffordshire Regiment, Brownhills
    - 6th Battalion, The Prince of Wales's North Staffordshire Regiment, Burton upon Trent
    - 7th Battalion, The Prince of Wales's North Staffordshire Regiment, Burton upon Trent
  - 177th Infantry Brigade
    - Headquarters, 177th Infantry Brigade & Signal Section, Royal Corps of Signals, Stafford
    - 5th Battalion, The South Staffordshire Regiment, Walsall
    - 1/6th Battalion, The South Staffordshire Regiment, Wolverhampton
    - 2/6th Battalion, The South Staffordshire Regiment, Bilston
  - Divisional Royal Artillery
    - Headquarters, Divisional Royal Artillery
    - 61st (North Midland) Field Regiment, Royal Artillery, Stoke-on-Trent
    - 116th Field Regiment, Royal Artillery, Hanley
  - Divisional Royal Engineers (cadre, not formed yet)

=== East Lancashire Area ===
East Lancashire Area comprised the areas of: Cumberland, Westmoreland and that part of Lancashire not included in West Lancashire Area.

- Headquarters, East Lancashire Area, Manchester under Brigadier General Cecil Francis Drew
- The Duke of Lancaster's Own Yeomanry (TA), Manchester
- 1/9th Battalion, The Manchester Regiment (TA), Ashton-under-Lyne, machine-gun battalion
- 2/9th Battalion, The Manchester Regiment (TA), Audenshaw, machine-gun battalion
- King’s Own Lancaster Regiment Depot, Bowerham Barracks
- Lancashire Fusiliers Depot, Wellington Barracks
- East Lancashire Regiment Depot, Burnley Barracks
- Border Regiment Depot, Carlisle Castle
- Loyal North Lancashire Regiment Depot, Fulwood Barracks
- Manchester Regiment Depot, Ladysmith Barracks
- 52nd (East Lancashire) Light Anti-Aircraft Regiment, Royal Artillery (TA), Burnley
- 56th (East Lancashire) Light Anti-Aircraft Regiment, Royal Artillery (TA), Oswaldtwistle
- 134th Light Anti-Aircraft Battery, Royal Artillery (TA), RAF Great Orton
- 13th Anti-Aircraft Depot, Royal Artillery, Carlisle Castle Barracks
- 23rd Searchlight Depot, Royal Artillery Carlisle Castle Barracks
- 275th Field Company, Royal Engineers (TA), Manchester
- 24th Army Tank Brigade (2/TA)
  - Headquarters, 24th Army Tank Brigade, Leeds
  - 41st (Oldham) Royal Tank Regiment, Oldham
  - 45th (Leeds Rifles) Royal Tank Regiment, Leeds
  - 47th (Oldham) Royal Tank Regiment, Oldham

==== 42nd (East Lancashire) Infantry Division (TA) ====
- 42nd (East Lancashire) Infantry Division, Manchester
  - Headquarters, 42nd Infantry Division commanded by Major General William George Holmes
  - 42nd (East Lancashire) Divisional Signals, Royal Corps of Signals, Manchester
  - 42nd Infantry Divisional Royal Army Service Corps, Manchester
  - 42nd Infantry Divisional Royal Army Ordnance Corps, Manchester
  - 42nd Infantry Divisional Royal Army Medical Corps, Manchester
  - 42nd Infantry Divisional Military Police Company, Corps of Military Police, Manchester
  - 125th (Lancashire Fusiliers) Infantry Brigade
    - Headquarters, 125th Infantry Brigade & Signal Section, Royal Corps of Signals, Bury
    - 1/5th Battalion, Lancashire Fusiliers, Bury
    - 1/6th Battalion, Lancashire Fusiliers, Rochdale
    - 1/8th Battalion, Lancashire Fusiliers, Salford
  - 126th Infantry Brigade
    - Headquarters, 126th Infantry Brigade & Signal Section, Royal Corps of Signals, Carlisle
    - 5th Battalion, The King's Own Royal Lancaster Regiment, Lancaster
    - 4th (Westmoreland) Battalion, The Border Regiment, Kendal
    - 5th (Cumberland) Battalion, The Border Regiment, Workington
  - 127th (Manchester) Infantry Brigade
    - Headquarters, 127th Infantry Brigade & Signal Section, Royal Corps of Signals, Ashton-under-Lyne
    - 4th Battalion, The East Lancashire Regiment, Blackburn
    - 5th Battalion, The Manchester Regiment, Wigan
    - 8th (Ardwick) Battalion, The Manchester Regiment, Ardwick
  - Divisional Royal Artillery
    - Headquarters, Divisional Royal Artillery, Whalley Range
    - 51st (Westmorland and Cumberland Yeomanry) Field Regiment, Royal Artillery, Carlisle
    - 52nd (Manchester) Field Regiment, Royal Artillery, Manchester
    - 53rd (Bolton) Field Regiment, Royal Artillery, Bolton
    - 56th (King's Own) Anti-Tank Regiment, Royal Artillery, Manchester
  - Divisional Royal Engineers
    - Headquarters, Divisional Royal Engineers, Manchester
    - 200th (East Lancashire) Field Company, Royal Engineers, Manchester
    - 201st (East Lancashire) Field Company, Royal Engineers, Manchester
    - 202nd (East Lancashire) Field Company, Royal Engineers, Manchester
    - 203rd (East Lancashire) Field Park Company, Royal Engineers, Smethwick

==== 66th Infantry Division (2/TA) ====
- 66th Infantry Division, Manchester
  - Headquarters, 66th Infantry Division commanded by Major General Arthur William Purser
  - 66th Divisional Signals, Royal Corps of Signals, Manchester
  - 66th Infantry Divisional Royal Army Service Corps, Manchester
  - 66th Infantry Divisional Royal Army Ordnance Corps, Manchester
  - 66th Infantry Divisional Royal Army Medical Corps, Manchester
  - 66th Infantry Divisional Military Police Company, Corps of Military Police, Manchester
  - 197th Infantry Brigade
    - Headquarters, 197th Infantry Brigade & Signal Section, Royal Corps of Signals, Bury
    - 2/5th Battalion, Lancashire Fusiliers, Bury
    - 2/6th Battalion, Lancashire Fusiliers, Middleton
    - 5th Battalion, The East Lancashire Regiment, Burnley
  - 198th Infantry Brigade
    - Headquarters, 198th Infantry Brigade & Signal Section, Royal Corps of Signals, Carlisle
    - 8th (Liverpool Irish) Battalion, The King's Liverpool Regiment, Liverpool
    - 6th (East Cumberland) Battalion, The Border Regiment, Carlisle
    - 7th (Cumberland) Battalion, The Border Regiment, Whitehaven
  - 199th Infantry Brigade
    - Headquarters, 199th Infantry Brigade & Signal Section, Royal Corps of Signals, Ashton-under-Lyne
    - 2/8th Battalion, Lancashire Fusiliers, Kersal
    - 6th Battalion, The Manchester Regiment, Leigh
    - 7th Battalion, The Manchester Regiment, Didsbury
  - Divisional Royal Artillery
    - Headquarters, Divisional Royal Artillery, Whalley Range
    - 109th Field Regiment, Royal Artillery, Workington
    - 110th Field Regiment, Royal Artillery, Manchester
    - 111th Field Regiment, Royal Artillery, Bolton
  - Divisional Royal Engineers
    - Headquarters, Divisional Royal Engineers, Manchester
    - 255th Field Company, Royal Engineers, Manchester
    - 256th Field Company, Royal Engineers, Manchester
    - 258th Field Park Company, Royal Engineers, Manchester

== London District ==
London District comprises County of London, Warley Barracks (Foot Guards only), Rainham Rifle Range, Purfleet, Woolwich (for Territorial Army Troops), Caterham Barracks, Pirbright, and (for regular troops) Combermere Barracks and Victoria Barracks.

- Headquarters, London District, Horse Guards commanded by Major-General Commanding the Brigade of Guards and General Officer Commanding London District Sir Andrew Thorne
- London District Pay Detachment, Royal Army Pay Corps, Deptford
- London District Pay Detachment, Royal Army Pay Corps, Regent's Park Barracks
- Lines of Communications Signals, Royal Corps of Signals (SR)
  - Headquarters, Lines of Communications Signals, Clapham Park
  - 1st (City of London) Lines of Communications Signals Section, Royal Corps of Signals (SR), Clapham
  - 4th (City of London) Lines of Communications Signals Section, Royal Corps of Signals (SR), London
- London District Signals, Royal Corps of Signals (TA), London
- London Corps Signals, Royal Corps of Signals (TA), Putney Bridge
- Mobile Divisional Signals (The Duke of Cambridge's Middlesex Hussars Yeomanry), Royal Corps of Signals (TA), Chelsea
- 2nd (London) Air Formation Signals, Royal Corps of Signals (SR), Putney Bridge
- 2nd (8th London) Construction Section, Royal Corps of Signals (SR), London
- 2nd (9th London) Construction Section, Royal Corps of Signals (SR), London
- 3rd (London) Construction Section, Royal Corps of Signals (SR), London
- Life Guards, Hyde Park Barracks
- Royal Horse Guards (The Blues), Combermere Barracks
- 1st Battalion, Scots Guards, Chelsea Barracks
- 1st Battalion, Irish Guards, Wellington Barracks
- 2nd Battalion, Irish Guards, Wellington Barracks
- Guards Depot, Caterham Barracks
- 5th Infantry Training Group, Pirbright
- 11th (Honourable Artillery Company) Regiment, Royal Horse Artillery, Finsbury Barracks
- 12th (Honourable Artillery Company) Regiment, Royal Horse Artillery, Finsbury Barracks
- 91st (4th London) Field Regiment, Royal Artillery (TA), Lewisham
- 92nd (5th London) Field Regiment, Royal Artillery (TA), Kennington Lane
- 139th Field Regiment, Royal Artillery (TA), Lewisham
- 140th Field Regiment, Royal Artillery (TA), Clapham Common
- 53rd (London) Medium Regiment, Royal Artillery (TA), Barnsbury
- 64th Medium Regiment, Royal Artillery (TA), Barnsbury
- 52nd (6th London) Anti-Tank Regiment, Royal Artillery (TA) Brixton
- 62nd Anti-Tank Regiment, Royal Artillery (TA), Stockwell
- K Battery, Royal Horse Artillery, St John's Wood (The Riding Troop, Royal Horse Artillery)
- Railway Stores Group, Royal Engineers (SR)
  - Headquarters, Railway Stores Group, Lambeth
  - 156th (Southern) Transit Stores Company, Royal Engineers (SR), Lambeth
- 216th (1st London) Field Company, Royal Engineers (TA), Bethnal Green
- 217th (1st London) Field Company, Royal Engineers (TA), Bethnal Green
- 218th (1st London) Field Company, Royal Engineers (TA), Bethnal Green
- 219th (1st London) Field Park Company, Royal Engineers (TA), Bethnal Green
- 221st (2nd London) Field Company, Royal Engineers (TA), Chelsea
- 222nd (2nd London) Field Company, Royal Engineers (TA), Chelsea
- 294th Field Company, Royal Engineers (TA), Barnet
- 295th Field Company, Royal Engineers (TA), Barnet
- 296th Field Company, Royal Engineers (TA), Barnet
- 297th Field Park Company, Royal Engineers (TA), Barnet
- 102nd (London) Army Troops Company, Royal Engineers (SR), Bethnal Green
- 151st (Great Western) Railway Construction Company, Royal Engineers (SR), Paddington station
- 152nd (Great Western) Railway Construction Company, Royal Engineers (SR), Paddington station
- Officers Producing Group
  - Group Headquarters, RHQ Welsh Guards, Birdcage Walk
  - 102nd (Westminster Dragoons) Officer Cadet Training Unit (TA), Westminster
  - The Inns of Court Regiment (TA), Lincoln's Inn
  - Artists Rifles (TA), Finsbury
  - 1st Observation Post Section, 11th (Honourable Artillery Company) Regiment, Royal Horse Artillery (TA), Finsbury Barracks
  - 2nd Observation Post Section, 11th (Honourable Artillery Company) Regiment, Royal Horse Artillery (TA), Finsbury Barracks
- 22nd Heavy Armoured Brigade (TA)
  - Headquarters, 22nd Heavy Armoured Brigade, St John's Wood
  - 3rd County of London Yeomanry (Sharpshooters), St John's Wood
  - 4th County of London Yeomanry (Sharpshooters), St John's Wood
  - 2nd Royal Gloucestershire Hussars, Bristol

=== 1st London Motor Division (TA) ===
- 1st London Motor Division, Finsbury Barracks
  - Headquarters, 1st London Motor Division commanded by Major General Claude Francis Liardet
  - 1st (City of London) London Divisional Signals, Royal Corps of Signals, Clapham Park
  - 1st Battalion, Queen Victoria's Rifles, Davies Street, motorcycle reconnaissance
  - 1st London Infantry Brigade
    - Headquarters, 1st London Infantry Brigade & Signal Section, Royal Corps of Signals, RHQ Grenadier Guards, Birdcage Walk
    - 8th (1st City of London) Battalion, The City of London Regiment (Royal Fusiliers), Bloomsbury
    - 9th (1st City of London) Battalion, The City of London Regiment (Royal Fusiliers), Balham
    - 1st Battalion, London Irish Rifles, Duke of York's Headquarters
  - 2nd London Infantry Brigade
    - Headquarters, 2nd London Infantry Brigade & Signal Section, Royal Corps of Signals, Finsbury Barracks
    - 1st Battalion, London Rifle Brigade, London
    - 1st Battalion, London Scottish, Westminster
    - 1st Battalion, The Queen's Westminsters, Queen's Hall
  - 3rd London Infantry Brigade (attached for administrative purposes)
    - Headquarters, 3rd London Infantry Brigade & Signal Section, Royal Corps of Signals, Tottenham Court Road
    - 1st London Rangers, Tottenham Court
    - 2nd London Rangers, Montague Street
    - 1st Tower Hamlet Rifles, Bow
    - 2nd Tower Hamlet Rifles, Bow
  - Divisional Royal Artillery
    - Headquarters, Divisional Royal Artillery, Finsbury Barracks
    - 64th (7th London) Field Regiment, Royal Artillery, Fulham
    - 90th (City of London) Field Regiment, Royal Artillery, Bloomsbury
  - Divisional Royal Engineers
    - Headquarters, Divisional Royal Engineers, Duke of York's Headquarters
    - 220th (2nd London) Field Company, Royal Engineers, Chelsea
    - 223rd (2nd London) Field Park Company, Royal Engineers, Chelsea

=== 2nd London Motor Division (2/TA) ===
- 2nd London Motor Division, London
  - Headquarters, 2nd London Motor Division commanded by Major General Harry Willans
  - 2nd (City of London) London Divisional Signals, Royal Corps of Signals, Clapham Park
  - 2nd Battalion, Queen Victoria's Rifles, Grosvenor, motorcycle reconnaissance
  - 4th London Infantry Brigade
    - Headquarters, 4th London Infantry Brigade & Signal Section, Royal Corps of Signals, RHQ Grenadier Guards, Birdcage Walk
    - 11th Battalion, The City of London Regiment (Royal Fusiliers), Fusilier Hall, SW1
    - 12th Battalion, The City of London Regiment (Royal Fusiliers), Balham
    - 2nd Battalion, London Irish Rifles, Duke of York's Headquarters
  - 5th London Infantry Brigade
    - Headquarters, 5th London Infantry Brigade & Signal Section, Royal Corps of Signals, Finsbury Barracks
    - 2nd Battalion, London Rifle Brigade, EC1
    - 2nd Battalion, London Scottish, Grosvenor
    - 2nd Battalion, Queen's Westminsters, Pinner
  - 6th London Infantry Brigade (attached for administrative purposes)
    - Headquarters, 3rd London Infantry Brigade & Signal Section, Royal Corps of Signals, Tottenham Court Road
    - 1st Battalion, Princess Louise's Kensington Regiment, Hammersmith, machine-gun
    - 2nd Battalion, Princess Louise's Kensington Regiment, Hammersmith, machine-gun
  - Divisional Royal Artillery
    - Headquarters, Divisional Royal Artillery, Finsbury Barracks
    - 117th Field Regiment, Royal Artillery, Fulham
    - 138th Field Regiment, Royal Artillery, Finsbury Barracks
  - Divisional Royal Engineers
    - Headquarters, Divisional Royal Engineers, Duke of York's Headquarters
    - 501st Field Company, Royal Engineers, Chelsea
    - 502nd Field Company, Royal Engineers, New Barnet
    - 503rd Field Company, Royal Engineers, New Barnet
    - 504th Field Park Company, Royal Engineers, New Barnet

== Southern Command ==
Southern Command comprised: Counties of Warwickshire, Northamptonshire, Huntingdonshire, Buckinghamshire, Berkshire (except Victoria Barracks and Combermere Barracks and that portion of the county included in the Aldershot Command), Oxfordshire, Hampshire (except that portion included in the Aldershot Command), Wiltshire, Dorset, Devonshire, Cornwall, Somerset, Gloucestershire (expect Beachley) and Worcestershire.

- Headquarters, Southern Command, Bulford Barracks commanded by Lieutenant General Bertie Drew Fisher
- Southern Command Pay Detachment, Royal Army Pay Corps, Wyvern Barracks
- Southern Command Pay Detachment, Royal Army Pay Corps, Hilsea Barracks
- Southern Command Pay Detachment, Royal Army Pay Corps, Bulford Barracks
- Southern Command Pay Detachment, Royal Army Pay Corps, Budbrooke Barracks
- Southern Command Pay Detachment, Royal Army Pay Corps, Peninsula Barracks
- Southern Command Signals, Royal Corps of Signals, Bulford Barracks
- 2nd Artillery Signal Section, Royal Corps of Signals, Bulford Barracks
- 5th Artillery Signal Section, Royal Corps of Signals, Bulford Barracks
- 7th Artillery Signal Section, Royal Corps of Signals, Bulford Barracks
- 9th Artillery Signal Section, Royal Corps of Signals, Bulford Barracks
- 2nd Artillery Signal Section, Royal Corps of Signals, Bulford Barracks
- 4th Artillery Signal Section, Royal Corps of Signals, Bulford Barracks
- 4th Air Formation Signals, Royal Corps of Signals (SR), Birmingham
- 1st Wireless Section, Royal Corps of Signals (SR), Coventry
- 2nd Wireless Section, Royal Corps of Signals (SR), Coventry
- 1st Survey Regiment, Royal Artillery, Royal Artillery Barracks, Larkhill
- 2nd Survey Regiment, Royal Artillery, Royal Artillery Barracks, Larkhill
- 9th Field Regiment, Royal Artillery, Bulford Barracks
- 3rd Medium Regiment, Royal Artillery, Royal Artillery Barracks, Larkhill
- 4th Anti-Aircraft Regiment, Royal Artillery, Bulford Barracks
- 2nd Searchlight Regiment, Royal Artillery, Clarence Barracks
- 58th Chemical Warfare Company, Royal Engineers, Porton Down
- Detachment from The Survey Battalion, Royal Engineers, Horfield Barracks
- 2nd Section, Royal Army Ordnance Corps, Bulford Barracks
- 3rd Section, Royal Army Ordnance Corps, Bovington Camp
- 4th Section, Royal Army Ordnance Corps, Vauxhall Barracks
- Corps Depot, Royal Army Ordnance Corps, Hilsea Barracks
- 4th Company, Royal Army Medical Corps, Netley Hospital
- 20th Company, Royal Army Ordnance Corps, Bulford Barracks
- Southern Command Veterinary Depot, Royal Army Veterinary Corps, Bulford Barracks

=== 1st Armoured Division ===
- 1st Armoured Division, Priory Lodge, Andore
  - Headquarters, 1st Armoured Division commanded by Major General Roger Evans
  - 1st Armoured Divisional Signals, Royal Corps of Signals, Bulford Barracks
  - 1st Armoured Divisional Royal Army Service Corps, Bulford Barracks
  - 1st Armoured Divisional Royal Army Ordnance Corps, Bulford Barracks
  - 1st Armoured Divisional Royal Army Medical Corps, Bulford Barracks
  - 1st Armoured Divisional Military Police Company, Corps of Military Police
  - 1st Light Armoured Brigade
    - Headquarters, 1st Light Armoured Brigade & Signal Section, Royal Corps of Signals, Tidworth Barracks
    - 1st King's Dragoon Guards, Aldershot
    - 3rd The King's Own Hussars, Tidworth Barracks
    - 4th Queen's Own Hussars, Tidworth Barracks
  - 2nd Light Armoured Brigade
    - Headquarters, 2nd Light Armoured Brigade & Signal Section, Royal Corps of Signals, Tidworth Barracks
    - The Queen's Bays (2nd Dragoon Guards), Tidworth Barracks
    - 9th Queen's Royal Lancers, Tidworth Barracks
    - 10th Royal Hussars (Prince of Wales' Own), Tidworth Barracks
  - 1st Heavy Armoured Brigade
    - Headquarters, 1st Heavy Armoured Brigade & Signal Section, Royal Corps of Signals, Perham Down
    - 2nd Royal Tank Regiment, Lille Barracks (Farnborough)
    - 3rd Royal Tank Regiment, Battlesbury Barracks
    - 5th Royal Tank Regiment, Perham Down
  - 1st Support Group
    - Headquarters, 1st Support Group & Signal Section, Royal Corps of Signals, Tidworth Barracks
    - 2nd Battalion, The King's Royal Rifle Corps, Tidworth Barracks (mechanised infantry)
    - 1st Battalion, The Prince Consort's Own Rifle Brigade, Tidworth Barracks (mechanised infantry)
    - 1st Field Regiment, Royal Horse Artillery, Bulford Barracks
    - 2nd Field Regiment, Royal Horse Artillery, Bulford Barracks
    - 1st Support Group Anti-Tank Company
    - Divisional Royal Engineers
      - 1st Field Squadron, Royal Engineers, Aldershot
      - 1st Field Park Troop, Royal Engineers, Tidworth Barracks
      - 1st Armoured Divisional Field Post, Royal Engineers, Bulford Barracks

=== 3rd Infantry Division ===
- 3rd Infantry Division, Bulford Barracks - Division contained regular and 1st Line TA units
  - Headquarters, 3rd Infantry Division commanded by Major General Bernard Law Montgomery
  - 3rd Infantry Divisional Signals, Royal Corps of Signals, Bulford Barracks
  - 15th/19th The King's Royal Hussars, Bulford Barracks (divisional reconnaissance)
  - 3rd Infantry Divisional Royal Army Service Corps, Bulford Barracks
  - 3rd Infantry Divisional Royal Army Ordnance Corps, Bulford Barracks
  - 3rd Infantry Divisional Royal Army Medical Corps, Bulford Barracks
  - 3rd Infantry Divisional Military Police Company, Corps of Military Police, Bulford Barracks
  - 7th (Guards) Infantry Brigade
    - Headquarters, 7th Infantry Brigade & Signal Section, Royal Corps of Signals, Elizabeth Barracks
    - 1st Battalion, Grenadier Guards, Elizabeth Barracks
    - 2nd Battalion, Grenadier Guards, Elizabeth Barracks
    - 1st Battalion, Coldstream Guards, Chelsea Barracks
    - 7th Infantry Brigade Anti-Tank Company, Elizabeth Barracks
  - 8th Infantry Brigade
    - Headquarters, 8th Infantry Brigade & Signal Section, Royal Corps of Signals, Crownhill Fort
    - 1st Battalion, The Suffolk Regiment, Raglan Barracks
    - 2nd Battalion, The Duke of York's Own East Yorkshire Regiment, Stonehouse Barracks
    - 2nd Battalion, The Gloucestershire Regiment, Stonehouse Barracks
    - 8th Infantry Brigade Anti-Tank Company, Stonehouse Barracks
  - 9th Infantry Brigade
    - Headquarters, 9th Infantry Brigade & Signal Section, Royal Corps of Signals, Cambridge Barracks
    - 2nd Battalion, The Lincolnshire Regiment, East Weare Camp
    - 1st Battalion, The King's Own Scottish Borderers, Cambridge Barracks
    - 2nd Battalion, The Royal Ulster Rifles, Albany Barracks
    - 9th Infantry Brigade Anti-Tank Company, Cambridge Barracks
  - Divisional Royal Artillery
    - Headquarters, Divisional Royal Artillery, Royal Artillery Barracks, Larkhill
    - 7th Field Regiment, Royal Artillery, Catterick Camp
    - 23rd Field Regiment, Royal Artillery, Wyvern Barracks
    - 33rd Field Regiment, Royal Artillery, Royal Artillery Barracks, Larkhill
    - 20th Anti-Tank Regiment, Royal Artillery, Catterick Camp
  - Divisional Royal Engineers
    - Headquarters, Divisional Royal Engineers, Bulford Barracks
    - 246th (Welsh) Field Company, Royal Engineers (TA), Cardiff
    - 248th (East Anglia) Field Company, Royal Engineers (TA), Bedford
    - 253rd (West Lancashire) Field Company, Royal Engineers (TA), St Helens
    - 15th Field Park Company, Royal Engineers, Bulford Barracks

=== Salisbury Plain Area ===
Salisbury Plain Area comprising: The County of Wiltshire (within the following boundaries): The Great Western Railway from the bridge over the River Avon at Freshford to the aqueduct of the Kennet and Avon Canal (1.5 miles west of Bradford-on-Avon), thence the Kennet and Avon Canal to Devizes, The Depot The Wiltshire Regiment, Devizes (on the north bank of the canal), thence the Kennet and Avon Canal to the County boundary at Froxfield, thence the county boundary from Froxfield to the road Fordingbridge-Salisbury at Downton. Thence the road Fordingbridge-Salisbury from the county boundary at Downton to Salisbury; Salisbury; the road Salisbury-Wilton-Great Wishford-Codford-Hegtesbury, the road Warminster-Frome to the county boundary at Whitbourne; thence the county boundary near Whitbourne to the Great Western Railway Bridge over the River Avon near Freshford. That portion of Hampshire including Tidworth and Western District land adjacent.

- Headquarters, Salisbury Plain Area, Bulford Barracks
- Wiltshire Regiment Depot, Le Marchant Barracks
- 2nd Field Depot, Royal Artillery, Fargo Barracks

=== South Midland Area ===
South Midland Area comprising: Counties of Warwickshire, Northamptonshire, Huntingdonshire, Buckinghamshire, Berkshire (except Victoria Barracks and Combermere Barracks and portions in Aldershot Command), Oxfordshire, Gloucestershire (except Beachley), Worcestershire, and Wiltshire north of the Salisbury Plain Area.

- Headquarters, South Midland Area, Cowley Barracks commanded by Colonel Hugh Tennant MacMullen
- 1st Battalion, Princess Victoria's Royal Irish Fusiliers, Cowley Barracks
- 4th Battalion, The Northamptonshire Regiment (TA), Northampton
- Warwickshire Regiment Depot, Budbrooke Barracks
- Gloucestershire Regiment Depot, Horfield Barracks
- Worcestershire Regiment Depot, Norton Barracks
- Oxfordshire and Buckinghamshire Light Infantry Depot, Bullingdon Barracks
- Northamptonshire Regiment Depot, Northampton Barracks
- Berkshire Regiment Depot, Brock Barracks
- 3rd Survey Regiment, Royal Artillery (TA), Bristol
- 5th Survey Regiment, Royal Artillery (TA), Bristol
- 22nd Light Anti-Aircraft Regiment, Royal Artillery (TA), RAF Cosford
- 89th Light Anti-Aircraft Battery, Royal Artillery (TA), RAF Bicester
- 128th Light Anti-Aircraft Battery, Royal Artillery (TA), RAF Brize Norton
- 131st Light Anti-Aircraft Battery, Royal Artillery (TA), RAF Aston Down
- 214 Medium Battery, Royal Artillery (TA), Huddersfield
- 212th (North Midland) Army Field Company, Royal Engineers (TA), Smethwick
- 268th Field Company, Royal Engineers (TA), Olton
- 215th Field Park Company, Royal Engineers (TA), Smethwick
- 269th Field Park Company, Royal Engineers (TA), Olton
- 20th Light Armoured Brigade (TA)
  - Headquarters, 20th Light Armoured Brigade, Gloucester
  - 1st Royal Gloucestershire Hussars, Gloucester
  - 1st Northamptonshire Yeomanry, Northampton
  - 2nd Northamptonshire Yeomanry, Northampton

==== 48th (South Midland) Infantry Division (TA) ====
- 48th (South Midland) Infantry Division, Oxford
  - Headquarters, 48th Infantry Division commanded by Major General Frank Crowther Roberts
  - 48th (South Midland) Divisional Signals, Royal Corps of Signals, Birmingham
  - 48th Infantry Divisional Royal Army Service Corps, Oxford
  - 48th Infantry Divisional Royal Army Ordnance Corps, Oxford
  - 48th Infantry Divisional Royal Army Medical Corps, Oxford
  - 48th Infantry Divisional Military Police Company, Corps of Military Police, Oxford
  - 143rd (West Midlands) Infantry Brigade
    - Headquarters, 143rd Infantry Brigade & Signal Section, Royal Corps of Signals, Birmingham
    - 1/7th Battalion, The Warwickshire Regiment, Coventry
    - 8th Battalion, The Warwickshire Regiment, Birmingham
    - 5th (Huntingdonshire) Battalion, The Northamptonshire Regiment, Peterborough
  - 144th (Gloucester and Worcester) Infantry Brigade
    - Headquarters, 144th Infantry Brigade & Signal Section, Royal Corps of Signals, Worcester
    - 5th Battalion, The Gloucestershire Regiment, Gloucester
    - 7th Battalion, The Worcestershire Regiment, Kidderminster
    - 8th Battalion, The Worcestershire Regiment, Worcester
  - 145th (South Midland) Infantry Brigade
    - Headquarters, 145th Infantry Brigade & Signal Section, Royal Corps of Signals, Reading
    - 4th Battalion, The Oxfordshire and Buckinghamshire Light Infantry, Oxford
    - 1st Buckinghamshire Battalion, The Oxfordshire and Buckinghamshire Light Infantry, Oxford
    - 4th Battalion, Princess Charlotte of Wales's Royal Berkshire Regiment, Reading
  - Divisional Royal Artillery
    - Headquarters, Divisional Royal Artillery, Oxford
    - 67th (South Midland) Field Regiment, Royal Artillery, Worcester
    - 68th (South Midland) Field Regiment, Royal Artillery, Birmingham
    - 99th (Buckinghamshire and Berkshire Yeomanry) Field Regiment, Royal Artillery, Aylesbury
    - 53rd (Worcestershire Yeomanry) Field Regiment, Royal Artillery, Kidderminster
  - Divisional Royal Engineers
    - Headquarters, Divisional Royal Engineers, Bristol
    - 224th (South Midland) Field Company, Royal Engineers, Bristol
    - 225th (South Midland) Field Company, Royal Engineers, Birmingham
    - 226th (South Midland) Field Company, Royal Engineers, Reading
    - 227th (South Midland) Field Park Company, Royal Engineers, Birmingham

==== 61st Infantry Division (2/TA) ====
- 61st (2nd South Midland) Infantry Division, Oxford
  - Headquarters, 61st Infantry Division commanded by Major General Robert John Collins
  - 61st (South Midland) Divisional Signals, Royal Corps of Signals, Oxford
  - 61st Infantry Divisional Royal Army Service Corps, Oxford
  - 61st Infantry Divisional Royal Army Ordnance Corps, Oxford
  - 61st Infantry Divisional Royal Army Medical Corps, Oxford
  - 61st Infantry Divisional Military Police Company, Corps of Military Police, Oxford
  - 182nd (2nd West Midlands) Infantry Brigade
    - Headquarters, 182nd Infantry Brigade & Signal Section, Royal Corps of Signals, Birmingham
    - 2/7th Battalion, The Warwickshire Regiment, Nuneaton
    - 8th Battalion, The Warwickshire Regiment, Birmingham
    - 9th Battalion, The Northamptonshire Regiment, Oldbury
  - 183rd (2nd Gloucester and Worcester) Infantry Brigade
    - Headquarters, 144th Infantry Brigade & Signal Section, Royal Corps of Signals, Worcester
    - 7th Battalion, The Gloucestershire Regiment, Stroud
    - 10th Battalion, The Worcestershire Regiment, Evesham
  - 184th (2nd South Midland) Infantry Brigade
    - Headquarters, 145th Infantry Brigade & Signal Section, Royal Corps of Signals, Reading
    - 5th Battalion, The Oxfordshire and Buckinghamshire Light Infantry, Oxford
    - 2nd Buckinghamshire Battalion, The Oxfordshire and Buckinghamshire Light Infantry, Slough
    - 6th Battalion, Princess Charlotte of Wales's Royal Berkshire Regiment, Reading

=== South-Western Area ===
South-Western Area comprising: Counties of Somerset, Dorsetshire, Devonshire and Cornwall, those portions of Wiltshire not included in South Midland and Salisbury Plain Areas, and that part of Hampshire lying west of the Southern Railway between the county boundary of Downton and the county boundary at Fordingbridge station.

- Headquarters, South-Western Area, Raglan Barracks commanded by Major General William Green
- The Prince of Wales's Own Royal Wiltshire Hussars Yeomanry (TA), Trowbridge
- North Somerset Yeomanry (TA), Bath
- 5th (Prince of Wales's) Battalion, The Devonshire Regiment (TA), Plymouth (machine-gun)
- 7th (Haytor) Battalion, The Devonshire Regiment (TA), Torquay (machine-gun)
- Devonshire Regiment Depot, Wyvern Barracks
- Somerset Light Infantry Depot, Jellalabad Barracks
- Duke of Cornwall's Light Infantry Depot, Victoria Barracks
- Dorsetshire Regiment Depot, The Keep, Dorchester
- 3rd Infantry Training Group, Newton Abbot
- 1st Heavy Regiment, Royal Artillery, Stonehouse Barracks
- 51st (Devon) Light Anti-Aircraft Regiment, Royal Artillery (TA), Exeter
- 55th (Devon) Light Anti-Aircraft Regiment, Royal Artillery (TA), Exeter
- 85th Light Anti-Aircraft Battery, Royal Artillery (TA), RAF Kemble
- 90th Light Anti-Aircraft Battery, Royal Artillery (TA), RAF Wroughton
- 91st Light Anti-Aircraft Battery, Royal Artillery (TA), RAF Mount Batten
- 8th Anti-Aircraft Depot, Royal Artillery, HMS Heron
- 20th Searchlight Depot, Royal Artillery, HMS Heron
- 22nd Depot, Royal Artillery, Jellalabad Barracks
- Portland Coast Defences
  - Headquarters, Portland Coast Defences, Weymouth
  - Portland Fire Command, Weymouth
  - Dorsetshire Heavy Regiment, Royal Artillery (TA), Weymouth
  - Dorsetshire Fortress Engineers, Royal Engineers (TA), Weymouth
- Plymouth and Falmouth Defences
  - Headquarters, Portland and Falmouth Defences, Plymouth
  - Devonshire and Cornwall Fortress Engineers, Royal Engineers (TA), Plymouth
  - South-Western Ports Fixed Defences
    - Headquarters, Fixed Defences, Plymouth
    - Rame Fire Command, Plymouth
    - Drake's Fire Command, HMS Drake
    - Wembury Fire Command, Wembury Point Holiday Camp
    - Devonshire Heavy Regiment, Royal Artillery (TA), Plymouth

==== 43rd (Wessex) Infantry Division (TA) ====
- 43rd (Wessex) Infantry Division, Salisbury
  - Headquarters, 43rd Infantry Division commanded by Major General Arthur Nugent Floyer-Acland
  - 43rd (Wessex) Infantry Divisional Signal, Royal Corps of Signals, Exeter
  - 43rd Infantry Divisional Royal Army Service Corps, Salisbury
  - 43rd Infantry Divisional Royal Army Ordnance Corps, Salisbury
  - 43rd Infantry Divisional Royal Army Medical Corps, Salisbury
  - 43rd Infantry Divisional Military Police Company, Corps of Military Police, Salisbury
  - 128th (Hampshire) Infantry Brigade
    - Headquarters, 128th Infantry Brigade & Signal Section, Royal Corps of Signals, Southampton
    - 1/4th Battalion, The Hampshire Regiment, Winchester
    - 2/4th Battalion, The Hampshire Regiment, Southampton
    - 5th Battalion, The Hampshire Regiment, Southampton
  - 129th (South Western) Infantry Brigade
    - Headquarters, 129th Infantry Brigade & Signal Section, Royal Corps of Signals, Bath
    - 4th Battalion, Prince Albert's Somerset Light Infantry, Bath
    - 4th Battalion, The Duke of Edinburgh's Wiltshire Regiment, Trowbridge
    - 5th Battalion, The Duke of Edinburgh's Wiltshire Regiment, Trowbridge
  - 130th (Hampshire and Dorset) Infantry Brigade
    - Headquarters, 130th Infantry Brigade & Signal Section, Royal Corps of Signals, Exeter
    - 7th Battalion, The Hampshire Regiment, Bournemouth
    - 4th Battalion, The Dorsetshire Regiment, Dorchester
    - 5th Battalion, The Dorsetshire Regiment, Poole
  - Divisional Royal Artillery
    - Headquarters, Divisional Royal Artillery, Salisbury
    - 94th (Queen's Own Dorset Yeomanry) Field Regiment, Royal Artillery, Dorchester
    - 112th Field Regiment, Royal Artillery, Swindon
    - 141st Field Regiment, Royal Artillery, Sherborne
    - 59th (Duke of Connaught's Hampshire) Anti-Tank Regiment, Royal Artillery, Portsmouth
  - Divisional Royal Engineers
    - Headquarters, Divisional Royal Engineers, Bath
    - 43rd Infantry Divisional Field Post, Royal Engineers, Bath
    - 204th (Wessex) Field Company, Royal Engineers, Bath
    - 260th Field Company, Royal Engineers, Chippenham
    - 207th (Wessex) Field Park Company, Royal Engineers, Bath

==== 45th Infantry Division (2/TA) ====
- 45th Infantry Division, Exeter
  - Headquarters, 45th Infantry Division commanded by Major General Frederick Vavasour Broome Witts
  - 45th (West Country) Divisional Signals, Royal Corps of Signals, Exeter
  - 45th Infantry Divisional Royal Army Service Corps, Exeter
  - 45th Infantry Divisional Royal Army Ordnance Corps, Exeter
  - 45th Infantry Divisional Royal Army Medical Corps, Exeter
  - 45th Infantry Divisional Military Police Company, Corps of Military Police, Exeter
  - 134th (Devonshire) Infantry Brigade
    - Headquarters, 134th Infantry Brigade & Signal Section, Royal Corps of Signals, Exeter
    - 4th (1st Rifle Volunteers) Battalion, The Devonshire Regiment, Exeter
    - 6th Battalion, The Devonshire Regiment, Barnstaple
    - 8th Battalion, The Devonshire Regiment, Exmouth
  - 135th (Somerset) Infantry Brigade
    - Headquarters, 135th Infantry Brigade & Signal Section, Royal Corps of Signals, Taunton
    - 5th Battalion, Prince Albert's Somerset Light Infantry, Taunton
    - 6th Battalion, Prince Albert's Somerset Light Infantry, Wells
    - 7th Battalion, Prince Albert's Somerset Light Infantry, Bridgewater
  - 136th (2nd Devon and Cornwall) Infantry Brigade
    - Headquarters, 135th Infantry Brigade & Signal Section, Royal Corps of Signals, Barnstaple
    - 9th Battalion, The Devonshire Regiment, Barnstaple
    - 4th Battalion, The Duke of Cornwall's Light Infantry, Truro
    - 5th Battalion, The Duke of Cornwall's Light Infantry, St Austell
  - Divisional Royal Artillery
    - Headquarters, Divisional Royal Artillery, Exeter
    - 55th (Wessex) Field Regiment, Royal Artillery, Taunton
    - 96th (Royal Devonshire Yeomanry) Field Regiment, Royal Artillery, Exeter
    - 142nd Field Regiment, Royal Artillery, Dartmouth
    - 69th Anti-Tank Regiment, Royal Artillery, Gosport
  - Divisional Royal Engineers
    - Headquarters, Divisional Royal Engineers, Exeter
    - 205th (Wessex) Field Company, Royal Engineers, Roborough
    - 259th Field Company, Royal Engineers, Uffculme
    - 261st Field Park Company, Royal Engineers, Uffculme

=== Southern Area ===
Southern Area comprising: Hampshire (excluding those portions of the county Included in Aldershot Command and Salisbury Plain and South-Western Areas.).

- Headquarters, Southern Area commanded by Brigadier John Noel Lumley
- Hampshire Regiment Depot, Peninsula Barracks
- Rifle Brigade Depot, Peninsula Barracks
- 1st Medium Regiment, Royal Artillery, Cambridge Barracks
- 4th Medium Regiment, Royal Artillery, Fort Brockhurst
- 71st Light Anti-Aircraft Battery, Royal Artillery (TA), RAF Fareham
- 84th Light Anti-Aircraft Battery, Royal Artillery (TA), RAF Boscombe Down
- 7th Anti-Aircraft Depot, Royal Artillery, Le Marchant Barracks
- 9th Anti-Aircraft Depot, Royal Artillery, Blandford Camp
- 19th Searchlight Depot, Royal Artillery, Le Marchant Barracks
- 21st Searchlight Depot, Royal Artillery, Blandford Camp
- The Survey Battalion, Royal Engineers, McMullen Barracks
- 19th Field Survey Company, Royal Engineers, Fort Fareham
- 4th Fortress Company, Royal Engineers, McMullen Barracks
- Experimental Bridging Establishment, Royal Engineers, Cavalry Barracks, Christchurch

== Anti-Aircraft Command (TA) ==
Anti-Aircraft Command controlled all of the AA units (minus the regular 1st and 2nd AA brigades).

- Headquarters, Anti-Aircraft Command, RAF Stanmore Park commanded by Lieutenant General Frederick Alfred Pile

=== 1st Anti-Aircraft Division ===
1st AA Division covering London, Dover, and Slough.

- Headquarters, 1st AA Division, RAF Uxbridge commanded by Major General Frederick Alfred Pile
- 1st Anti-Aircraft Divisional Signals, Royal Corps of Signals, RAF Northolt
- 1st Anti-Aircraft Divisional Workshop, Royal Army Ordnance Corps, RAF Chingford
- 26th (London) Anti-Aircraft Brigade
  - Headquarters, 26th AA Brigade, Brompton Road
  - 53rd (City of London) Heavy Anti-Aircraft Regiment, Royal Artillery, War Office
  - 86th (Honourable Artillery Company) Heavy Anti-Aircraft Regiment, Royal Artillery, Finsbury
  - 88th Heavy Anti-Aircraft Regiment, Royal Artillery, White City
  - 26th AA Brigade Company, Royal Army Service Corps, Brompton Road
- 38th (London) Light Anti-Aircraft Brigade
  - Headquarters, 38th LAA Bde, Duke of York's Headquarters
  - 26th (London Electrical Engineers) Anti-Aircraft Battalion, Royal Engineers, Duke of York's Headquarters
  - 27th (London Electrical Engineers) Anti-Aircraft Battalion, Royal Engineers, Mitcham Lane
  - 75th (Middlesex) Searchlight Regiment, Royal Artillery, Cowley
  - 38th AA Bde Company, Royal Army Service Corps, Wandsworth
- 48th (City of London) Anti-Aircraft Brigade
  - Headquarters, 48th AA Bde, Lewisham
  - 54th (City of London) Heavy Anti-Aircraft Regiment, Royal Artillery, Putney
  - 60th (City of London) Heavy Anti-Aircraft Regiment, Royal Artillery, Catford
  - 97th (The London Scottish) Heavy Anti-Aircraft Regiment, Royal Artillery, Westminster
  - 99th (London Welsh) Heavy Anti-Aircraft Regiment, Royal Artillery, London W8
  - 48th AA Bde Company, Royal Army Service Corps, Lewisham
- 49th (London) Anti-Aircraft Brigade
  - Headquarters, 49th AA Bde, Lower Belgrave Street
  - 51st (London) Heavy Anti-Aircraft Regiment, Royal Artillery, Duke of York's Headquarters
  - 52nd (London) Heavy Anti-Aircraft Regiment, Royal Artillery, Acton
  - 84th (Middlesex, London Transport) Heavy Anti-Aircraft Regiment, Royal Artillery, Willesden
  - 48th AA Bde Company, Royal Army Service Corps, Lower Belgrave Street

=== 2nd Anti-Aircraft Division ===
2nd AA Division covering Kingston upon Hull, The Humber, Leeds, Sheffield, and Nottingham. Aligned with No. 12 Group RAF.

- Headquarters 2nd AA Division, RAF Hucknall
- 2nd AA Division Signals, Royal Corps of Signals, RAF Hucknall
- 2nd AA Division Workshop, Royal Army Ordnance Corps, RAF Hucknall
- 32nd (Midland) Anti-Aircraft Brigade
  - Headquarters, 32nd AA Bde, Derby
  - 68th (North Midland) Heavy Anti-Aircraft Regiment, Royal Artillery, Derby
  - 42nd (The Robin Hoods, Sherwood Foresters) Anti-Aircraft Battalion, Royal Engineers, Nottingham
  - 44th (The Leicestershire Regiment) Anti-Aircraft Battalion, Royal Engineers, Leicester
  - 50th (The Northamptonshire Regiment) Anti-Aircraft Battalion, Royal Engineers, Northampton
  - 32nd AA Bde Company, Royal Army Service Corps, Derby
- 40th (South Midlands) Anti-Aircraft Brigade
  - Headquarters, 40th AA Bde, Duxford
  - 60th (9th Battalion, The Duke of Cambridge's Own Middlesex Regiment) Searchlight Regiment, Royal Artillery, Willesden
  - 69th (10th (3rd City of London) Battalion, The City of London Regiment (Royal Fusiliers)) Searchlight Regiment, Royal Artillery, Harrow Road
  - 33rd (St Pancras) Anti-Aircraft Battalion, Royal Engineers, Albany Street
  - 36th (Middlesex) Anti-Aircraft Battalion, Royal Engineers, Edgware
  - 58th (Middlesex) Anti-Aircraft Battalion, Royal Engineers, Harrow
  - 40th AA Bde Company, Royal Army Service Corps, Barking
- 41st (London) Anti-Aircraft Brigade
  - Headquarters, 41st AA Bde, Ebury Street
  - 78th (1st East Anglian) Heavy Anti-Aircraft Regiment, Royal Artillery, Norwich
  - 32nd (7th (City of London) Battalion, The City of London Regiment (Royal Fusiliers)) Anti-Aircraft Battalion, Royal Engineers, Finsbury Square
  - 64th (1/6th Battalion, The Essex Regiment) Searchlight Regiment, Royal Artillery, The Cedars
  - 65th (2/6th Battalion, The Essex Regiment) Searchlight Regiment, Royal Artillery, Southend-on-Sea
- 50th Light Anti-Aircraft Brigade
  - Headquarters, 50th LAA Bde, Nottingham
  - 26th Light Anti-Aircraft Regiment, Royal Artillery, Derby (Mobile reserve)

=== 3rd Anti-Aircraft Division ===
3rd AA Division covering the Firth of Forth, The Clyde, Scapa Flow, Tyne River, Tees River, and Belfast. Aligned with No. 13 Group RAF.

- Headquarters, 3rd AA Division, RAF Edinburgh
- 3rd AA Division Signals, Royal Corps of Signals, RAF Edinburgh
- 3rd AA Division Workshop, Royal Army Ordnance Corps, RAF Edinburgh
- 3rd (Northern Ireland) Anti-Aircraft Brigade (Supplementary Reserve)
  - Headquarters, 3rd AA Brigade, Belfast
  - 3rd (Ulster) Searchlight Regiment, Royal Artillery, Belfast
  - 8th (Belfast) Heavy Anti-Aircraft Regiment, Royal Artillery, Belfast
  - 9th (Londonderry) Heavy Anti-Aircraft Regiment, Royal Artillery, Derry
  - 102nd Heavy Anti-Aircraft Regiment, Royal Artillery, Antrim
  - 3rd AA Bde Company, Royal Army Service Corps, Belfast
- 36th Anti-Aircraft Brigade
  - Headquarters, 36th AA Bde, Edinburgh
  - 71st (Forth) Heavy Anti-Aircraft Regiment, Royal Artillery, Dunfermline
  - 94th Heavy Anti-Aircraft Regiment, Royal Artillery, Turnhouse
  - 101st Heavy Anti-Aircraft Regiment, Royal Artillery, Inverness
  - 36th AA Bde Company, Royal Army Service Corps, Edinburgh
- 42nd Anti-Aircraft Brigade
  - Headquarters, 42nd AA Bde, Glasgow
  - 74th (City of Glasgow) Heavy Anti-Aircraft Regiment, Royal Artillery, Glasgow
  - 83rd (Blythswood) Heavy Anti-Aircraft Regiment, Royal Artillery, Bridgeton
  - 100th Heavy Anti-Aircraft Regiment, Royal Artillery, Inverness
  - 42nd AA Bde Company, Royal Army Service Corps, Glasgow
- 51st Light Anti-Aircraft Brigade
  - Headquarters, 51st LAA Bde, Edinburgh
  - 14th (West Lothian, Royal Scots) Light Anti-Aircraft Regiment, Royal Artillery, Edinburgh
  - 18th Light Anti-Aircraft Regiment, Royal Artillery, Glasgow
  - 19th Light Anti-Aircraft Regiment, Royal Artillery, Edinburgh
  - 31st Light Anti-Aircraft Regiment, Royal Artillery, Perth
  - 32nd Light Anti-Aircraft Regiment, Royal Artillery, Falkirk
- 52nd Light Anti-Aircraft Brigade
  - Headquarters, 52nd AA Bde, Stirling
  - 51st (Highland) Anti-Aircraft Battalion, Royal Engineers, Dundee
  - 52nd (4th/5th (Queen's Edinburgh) Battalion, The Royal Scots) Searchlight Regiment, Royal Artillery, Edinburgh
  - 56th (5th Battalion, The Scottish Rifles (Cameronians)) Searchlight Regiment, Royal Artillery, Glasgow
  - 57th (8th Battalion, The Scottish Rifles (Cameronians)) Searchlight Regiment, Royal Artillery, South Glasgow

=== 4th Anti-Aircraft Division ===
4th AA Division covering Liverpool, Birmingham, Coventry, Manchester, Cardiff, and Newport. Aligned with No. 9 Group RAF.

- Headquarters, 4th AA Division, RAF Hawarden
- 4th AA Division Signals, Royal Corps of Signals, RAF Hawarden
- 4th AA Division Workshop, Royal Army Ordnance Corps, RAF Hawarden
- 33rd (Western) Anti-Aircraft Brigade
  - Headquarters, 33rd AA Bde, Woolton
  - 70th (3rd West Lancashire) Heavy Anti-Aircraft Regiment, Royal Artillery, Liverpool
  - 81st Heavy Anti-Aircraft Regiment, Royal Artillery, Stockport
  - 93rd Heavy Anti-Aircraft Regiment, Royal Artillery, Oxton
  - 62nd (Loyals) Searchlight Regiment, Royal Artillery, Preston
  - 38th (The King's Regiment) Anti-Aircraft Battalion, Royal Engineers, Liverpool
  - 33rd AA Bde Company, Royal Army Service Corps, Woolton
- 34th (South Midland) Anti-Aircraft Brigade
  - Headquarters, 34th AA Bde, Coventry
  - 69th (Royal Warwickshire Regiment) Heavy Anti-Aircraft Regiment, Royal Artillery, Edgbaston
  - 73rd Heavy Anti-Aircraft Regiment, Royal Artillery, Wolverhampton
  - 95th Heavy Anti-Aircraft Regiment, Royal Artillery, Birmingham
  - 34th AA Bde Company, Royal Army Service Corps, Coventry
- 44th (East Lancashire) Anti-Aircraft Brigade
  - Headquarters, 44th AA Bde, Manchester
  - 65th (The Manchester Regiment) Heavy Anti-Aircraft Regiment, Royal Artillery, Hulme
  - 71st (East Lancashire) Searchlight Regiment, Royal Artillery, Manchester
  - 39th (The Lancashire Fusiliers) Anti-Aircraft Battalion, Royal Engineers, Salford
  - 44th AA Bde Company, Royal Army Service Corps, Manchester
- 53rd (West Lancashire) Light Anti-Aircraft Brigade
  - Headquarters, 53rd AA Bde, Chester
  - 15th (Isle of Man) Light Anti-Aircraft Regiment, Royal Artillery, Douglas, Isle of Man (technically not a 'British' unit, see: Isle of Man for more)
  - 21st Light Anti-Aircraft Regiment, Royal Artillery, Liverpool
  - 33rd Light Anti-Aircraft Regiment, Royal Artillery, Liverpool
  - 53rd AA Bde Company, Royal Army Service Corps, Chester
- 54th (North Midland) Anti-Aircraft Brigade
  - Headquarters, 54th AA Bde, South Birmingham
  - 59th (Warwickshire) Searchlight Regiment, Royal Artillery, Birmingham
  - 61st (South Lancashire Regiment) Searchlight Regiment, Royal Artillery, St Helen
  - 41st (5th Battalion, The Prince of Wales's North Staffordshire Regiment) Anti-Aircraft Battalion, Royal Engineers, Stoke-on-Trent
  - 45th (Royal Warwickshire Regiment) Anti-Aircraft Battalion, Royal Engineers, Birmingham
  - 54th AA Bde Company, Royal Army Service Corps, South Birmingham

=== 5th Anti-Aircraft Division ===
5th AA Division covering Bristol, Plymouth, Portsmouth, Isle of Portland, Southampton, and Cardiff. Aligned with No. 10 Group RAF.

- Headquarters, 5th AA Division, RAF Henley-on-Thames
- 5th AA Divisional Signals, Royal Corps of Signals, RAF Henley-on-Thames
- 5th AA Divisional Workshop, Royal Army Ordnance Corps, RAF Henley-on-Thames
- 35th (Southern) Anti-Aircraft Brigade
  - Headquarters, 35th AA Bde, Fareham
  - 56th (Cornwall) Heavy Anti-Aircraft Regiment, Royal Artillery, Falmouth
  - 57th (Wessex) Heavy Anti-Aircraft Regiment, Royal Artillery, Portsmouth
  - 72nd (Hampshire) Heavy Anti-Aircraft Regiment, Royal Artillery, Southampton
  - 48th (Hampshire) Anti-Aircraft Battalion, Royal Engineers, Portsmouth
  - 35th AA Bde Company, Royal Army Service Corps, Fareham
- 45th (Welsh) Anti-Aircraft Brigade
  - Headquarters, 45th AA Bde, Cardiff
  - 77th (Welsh) Heavy Anti-Aircraft Regiment, Royal Artillery, Cardiff
  - 67th (6th (Glamorgan) Battalion, The Welch Regiment) Searchlight Regiment, Royal Artillery, Cardiff
  - 68th (1st (Rifle) Battalion, The Monmouthshire Regiment) Searchlight Regiment, Royal Artillery, Newport
  - 45th AA Bde Company, Royal Army Service Corps, Cardiff
- 46th (Gloucestershire) Anti-Aircraft Brigade
  - Headquarters, 46th AA Bde, Bristol
  - 76th (Gloucestershire) Heavy Anti-Aircraft Regiment, Royal Artillery, Clifton
  - 98th Heavy Anti-Aircraft Regiment, Royal Artillery, Cheltenham
  - 66th (4th (City of Bristol) Battalion, The Gloucestershire Regiment) Searchlight Regiment, Royal Artillery, Bristol
  - 46th AA Bde Company, Royal Army Service Corps, Bristol
- 47th (South) Anti-Aircraft Brigade
  - Headquarters, 47th AA Bde, Grosvenor Gardens
  - 80th (Berkshire) Heavy Anti-Aircraft Regiment, Royal Artillery, Reading
  - 63rd (4th Battalion, The Queen's Royal West Surrey Regiment) Searchlight Regiment, Royal Artillery, Croydon
  - 72nd (Middlesex) Searchlight Regiment, Royal Artillery, Twickenham
  - 30th (Surrey) Anti-Aircraft Battalion, Royal Engineers, Kingston upon Thames
  - 35th (First Surrey Rifles) Anti-Aircraft Battalion, Royal Engineers, Camberwell
  - 47th AA Bde Company, Royal Army Service Corps, Grosvenor Gardens

=== 6th Anti-Aircraft Division ===
6th AA Division covering Thames and Medway and Harwich. Aligned with No. 11 Group RAF.

- Headquarters, 6th AA Division, RAF Uxbridge
- 6th AA Divisional Signals, Royal Corps of Signals, RAF Uxbridge
- 6th AA Divisional Workshop, Royal Army Ordnance Corps, RAF Uxbridge
- 27th (Home Counties) Anti-Aircraft Brigade
  - Headquarters, 27th AA Bde, Lingfield
  - 70th (Sussex) Searchlight Regiment, Royal Artillery, Brighton
  - 31st (City of London Rifles) Anti-Aircraft Battalion, Royal Engineers, Sutton
  - 34th (Queen's Own Royal West Kent) Anti-Aircraft Battalion, Royal Engineers, Blackheath
  - 27th AA Bde Company, Royal Army Service Corps, Lingfield
- 28th (Thames and Medway) Anti-Aircraft Brigade
  - Headquarters, 28th AA Bde, Kitchener Barracks, Kitchener Barracks
  - 55th (Kent) Heavy Anti-Aircraft Regiment, Royal Artillery, Rochester
  - 58th (Kent) Heavy Anti-Aircraft Regiment, Royal Artillery, Erith
  - 75th (Home Counties) (Cinque Ports) Heavy Anti-Aircraft Regiment, Royal Artillery, Dover
  - 89th (Cinque Ports) Heavy Anti-Aircraft Regiment, Royal Artillery, Sittingbourne
  - 28th AA Bde Company, Royal Army Service Corps, Kitchener Barracks
- 29th (East Anglian) Anti-Aircraft Brigade
  - Headquarters, 29th AA Bde, South Kensington
  - 28th (Essex) Anti-Aircraft Battalion, Royal Engineers, Brentwood
  - 29th (Kent) Anti-Aircraft Battalion, Royal Engineers, Chatham
  - 73rd (Kent Fortress) Anti-Aircraft Battalion, Royal Engineers, Bexleyheath
  - 74th (Essex Fortress) Anti-Aircraft Battalion, Royal Engineers, Tottenham
  - 29th AA Bde Company, Royal Army Service Corps, South Kensington
- 37th (Home Counties) Anti-Aircraft Brigade
  - Headquarters, 37th AA Bde, Hendon
  - 59th (Essex Regiment) Heavy Anti-Aircraft Regiment, Royal Artillery, Walthamstow
  - 61st (Middlesex) Heavy Anti-Aircraft Regiment, Royal Artillery, Pentonville
  - 79th (Hertfordshire Yeomanry) Heavy Anti-Aircraft Regiment, Royal Artillery, Watford
  - 82nd (Essex) Heavy Anti-Aircraft Regiment, Royal Artillery, Barking
  - 90th Heavy Anti-Aircraft Regiment, Royal Artillery, Barking
  - 37th AA Bde Company, Royal Army Service Corps, Hendon
- 56th (Home Counties) Light Anti-Aircraft Brigade
  - Headquarters, 56th LAA Bde, RAF Uxbridge
  - 11th (City of London Yeomanry) Light Anti-Aircraft Regiment, Royal Artillery, London EC1
  - 12th (Finsbury Rifles) Light Anti-Aircraft Regiment, Royal Artillery, Pentonville
  - 16th Light Anti-Aircraft Regiment, Royal Artillery, Sittingbourne
  - 17th Light Anti-Aircraft Regiment, Royal Artillery, Chelsea

=== 7th Anti-Aircraft Division ===
7th AA Division covering River Tyne, River Tees, and Middlesbrough.

- Headquarters, 7th AA Division, RAF Newcastle
- 7th AA Divisional Signals, Royal Corps of Signals, RAF Newcastle
- 7th AA Divisional Workshop, Royal Army Ordnance Corps, RAF Newcastle
- 30th (Northumbrian) Anti-Aircraft Brigade
  - Headquarters, 30th AA Bde, Sunderland
  - 63rd (Northumbrian) Heavy Anti-Aircraft Regiment, Royal Artillery, Sunderland
  - 64th (Northumbrian) Heavy Anti-Aircraft Regiment, Royal Artillery, North Shields
  - 87th Heavy Anti-Aircraft Regiment, Royal Artillery, Hebburn
  - 53rd (5th Battalion, The Royal Northumberland Fusiliers) Searchlight Regiment, Royal Artillery, Walker on Tyne
  - 37th (Tyne Electrical Engineers) Anti-Aircraft Battalion, Royal Engineers, Tynemouth
  - 30th AA Bde Company, Royal Army Service Corps, Sunderland
- 31st (North Midland) Anti-Aircraft Brigade
  - Headquarters, 31st AA Bde, York
  - 66th (Leeds Rifles) (West Yorkshire Regiment) Heavy Anti-Aircraft Regiment, Royal Artillery, Leeds
  - 96th Heavy Anti-Aircraft Regiment, Royal Artillery, Castleford
  - 43rd (5th Duke of Wellington's Regiment) Anti-Aircraft Battalion, Royal Engineers, Huddersfield
  - 49th (The West Yorkshire Regiment) Anti-Aircraft Battalion, Royal Engineers, Bradford
- 39th (Eastern) Anti-Aircraft Brigade
  - Headquarters, 39th AA Bde, RAF Digby
  - 62nd (Northumbrian) Heavy Anti-Aircraft Regiment, Royal Artillery, Kingston upon Hull
  - 67th (York and Lancaster Regiment) Heavy Anti-Aircraft Regiment, Royal Artillery, Rotherham
  - 91st Heavy Anti-Aircraft Regiment, Royal Artillery, Goole
  - 40th (The Sherwood Foresters) Anti-Aircraft Battalion, Royal Engineers, Chesterfield
  - 46th (The Lincolnshire Regiment) Anti-Aircraft Battalion, Royal Engineers, Grimsby
  - 39th AA Bde Company, Royal Army Service Corps, RAF Digby
- 43rd (Durham) Anti-Aircraft Brigade
  - Headquarters, 43rd AA Bde, West Hartlepool
  - 85th (Tees) Heavy Anti-Aircraft Regiment, Royal Artillery, Middlesbrough
  - 54th (1/5th Battalion, The Durham Light Infantry) Searchlight Regiment, Royal Artillery, Stockton-on-Tees
  - 55th (2/5th Battalion, The Durham Light Infantry) Searchlight Regiment, Royal Artillery, West Hartlepool
  - 47th (Durham Light Infantry) Anti-Aircraft Battalion, Royal Engineers, Sunderland
  - 43rd AA Bde Company, Royal Army Service Corps, West Hartlepool
- 57th (Eastern) Light Anti-Aircraft Brigade
  - Headquarters, 57th LAA Bde, RAF Newcastle
  - 13th Light Anti-Aircraft Regiment, Royal Artillery, Hillsborough
  - 28th Light Anti-Aircraft Regiment, Royal Artillery, Nottingham
  - 29th Light Anti-Aircraft Regiment, Royal Artillery, Grimsby
  - 30th Light Anti-Aircraft Regiment, Royal Artillery, Ipswich

== Middle East Command ==
Middle East Command controlled all the forces based in: Sudan, Aden, Somaliland, Palestine, Transjordan, and Egypt.

- Headquarters, Middle East Command, Cairo commanded by Lieutenant General Sir Archibald Percival Wavell
- Somaliland Camel Corps, Laferung

=== British Troops in Aden ===
- Headquarters, British Troops Aden, Khormaksar commanded by Air vice-marshal Sir George Ranald MacFarlane Reid
- Aden Signal Section, Royal Corps of Signals, Aden
- 2nd Battalion, 5th Mahratta Light Infantry, Khormaksar
- Aden Protectorate Levies, Khormaksar
- 5th Heavy Regiment, Royal Artillery, Aden
- 20th Fortress Company, Royal Engineers, Aden
- Eastern Aden Protectorate
  - Kathiri Armed Constabulary
  - Mukalla Regular Army
- Western Aden Protectorate
  - Government Guards
  - Tribal Guards
  - Lahij Trained Forces

=== British Troops in Egypt ===
- Headquarters, Cairo commanded by Lieutenant General Henry Maitland Wilson
- Egypt Command Signals, Royal Corps of Signals, Cairo
  - Delta Area Signal Section, Alexandria
  - 1st Signal Company
  - 3rd Signal Company
- 1st Light Tank Signal Section
- 6th Tank Signal Section
- 3rd Battalion, Coldstream Guards, Alexandria
- 1st Battalion, The Hampshire Regiment, El Daba
- 4th Field Regiment, Royal Horse Artillery
- 7th Medium Regiment, Royal Artillery
- 19th Heavy Battery, Royal Artillery, Port Said
- 42nd Field Company, Royal Engineers
- 3rd Company, Royal Army Service Corps
- 23rd Company, Royal Army Service Corps
- 28th Company, Royal Army Service Corps
- 29th Company, Royal Army Service Corps
- 37th Company, Royal Army Service Corps
- 63rd Company, Royal Army Service Corps
- 64th Company, Royal Army Service Corps
- 'D' Supply Personnel Company, Royal Army Service Corps, Cairo
- 12th Company, Royal Army Ordnance Corps
- 33rd Company, Royal Army Medical Corps
- 18th Infantry Brigade and HQ Cairo Area
  - Headquarters, 18th Inf Bde, Cairo
  - 1st Battalion, The Bedfordshire and Hertfordshire Regiment, Cairo
  - 1st Battalion, The Royal Northumberland Fusiliers, Cairo
- Canal Brigade
  - Headquarters, Canal Bde, Moascar
  - 1st Battalion, The Royal Sussex Regiment, Moascar
  - 1st Battalion, The Essex Regiment, Moascar
- 11th Indian Infantry Brigade
  - Headquarters, 11th Indian Bde, RAF Fayid
  - 2nd Battalion, The Cameron Highlanders, RAF Fayid
  - 1st Battalion, 6th Rajputana Rifles, RAF Fayid
  - 4th Battalion, 7th Rajput Regiment, RAF Fayid
  - 4th Field Regiment, Royal Artillery, Mena Camp
  - 18th Field Company, Bombay Sappers and Miners, Indian Engineers

==== Armoured Division (Egypt) ====
- Armoured Division (Egypt), Gerwala
  - Headquarters, Egypt Armoured Division commanded by Major General Percy Cleghorn Stanley Hobart
  - Egypt Divisional Signals, Royal Corps of Signals
  - 11th Hussars (Prince Albert's Own) (armoured reconnaissance)
  - 1st Battalion, The King's Royal Rifle Corps (mechanised infantry)
  - C Battery, 4th Field Regiment, Royal Artillery
  - H Anti-Tank Battery, 3rd Field Regiment, Royal Horse Artillery
  - Egypt Divisional Company, Royal Army Service Corps
  - Egypt Divisional Field Ambulance, Royal Army Medical Corps
  - Egypt Light Armoured Brigade
    - Headquarters, Light Armoured Bde, Gerwala
    - 7th Queen's Own Hussars
    - 8th King's Royal Irish Hussars
  - Egypt Heavy Armoured Brigade
    - Headquarters, Heavy Armoured Bde, Gerwala
    - 1st Royal Tank Regiment (light armoured)
    - 6th Royal Tank Regiment

==== 7th Infantry Division (Forming) ====
- 7th Infantry Division, Egypt (forming)
  - Headquarters, 7th Infantry Division commanded by Major General Richard Nugent O'Connor
  - Cairo Brigade
    - Headquarters, Cairo Bde, Mersa Matruh
    - 2nd Battalion, Scots Guards, Mersa Matruh
    - 1st Battalion, The Royal East Kent Regiment (Buffs), Mersa Matruh
  - Divisional Royal Artillery
    - Headquarters, Divisional Royal Artillery
    - 31st Field Regiment, Royal Artillery, Mersa Matruh
    - P Anti-Tank Battery, 3rd Field Regiment, Royal Horse Artillery
  - Divisional Royal Engineers
    - Headquarters, Divisional Royal Engineers
    - 2nd Field Company, Royal Engineers
    - 54th Field Company, Royal Engineers
    - 56th Field Company, Royal Engineers

=== British Troops in Palestine and Transjordan ===
- Headquarters, British Troops in Palestine and Transjordan, Jerusalem commanded by Lieutenant General Michael Barker
- Transjordan Frontier Force, Zarga
- The Arab Legion, Amman
- 17th Heavy Battery, Royal Artillery, Haifa
- 45th Fortress Company, Royal Engineers, Palestine
- 23rd Company, Royal Army Medical Corps
- Jerusalem Area
  - Headquarters, Jerusalem Area, Jerusalem
  - Palestine Command Signals, Royal Corps of Signals
  - 2nd Wireless Signal Company, Royal Corps of Signals, Sarafand al-Amar
  - 2nd Battalion, The Royal Highland Regiment (The Black Watch)
  - 2nd Battalion, The City of Glasgow Regiment (Highland Light Infantry)
  - 2nd Battalion, The King's Own Royal Lancaster Regiment, Hebron
- Lydda Area
  - Headquarters, Lydd Area, Lydda
  - The Royal Scots Greys (2nd Dragoons), Rehovot
  - 2nd Battalion, The Duke of Wellington's West Riding Regiment, Sarafand al-Amar
  - 56th Field Company, Royal Engineers
  - Detachment, 8th Railway Construction Company, Royal Engineers

==== 8th Infantry Division ====
- 8th Infantry Division, Jerusalem
  - Headquarters, 8th Infantry Division commanded by Major General Alfred Reade Godwin-Austen
  - 1st Royal Dragoons, Gedera (divisional reconnaissance)
  - 12th Field Company, Royal Engineers
  - Troop, A/E Battery, 1st Regiment Royal Horse Artillery
  - Troop, B/O Battery, 1st Regiment Royal Horse Artillery
  - 14th Infantry Brigade
    - Headquarters, 14th Infantry Brigade & Signal Section, Royal Corps of Signals, Nablus
    - 2nd Battalion, The Prince Consort's Own Rifle Brigade, Nablus Fort
    - 1st Battalion, Princess Louises's Argyll and Sutherland Highlanders, Jenin
    - 2nd Battalion, The Queen's Royal West Surrey Regiment, Tulkarm
  - 16th Infantry Brigade
    - Headquarters, 16th Infantry Brigade & Signal Section, Royal Corps of Signals, North Palestine
    - 1st Battalion, The South Staffordshire Regiment, Nazareth-Tiberias
    - 1st Battalion, The Welch Regiment, Safed
    - 2nd Battalion, The Leicestershire Regiment, Acre
    - 1st Battalion, The Nottinghamshire and Derbyshire Regiment (The Sherwood Foresters), Haifa

=== British troops in The Sudan ===
- Headquarters, The Sudan, Khartoum commanded by Major General William Platt
- 1st Battalion, The Worcestershire Regiment, Wadi Halfa
- 2nd Battalion, The York and Lancaster Regiment, Khartoum South
- 1st Battalion, The Cheshire Regiment, Khartoum North (Machine-gun)
- Sudan Heavy Detachment, Royal Artillery, Port Sudan
- Sudan Defence Force
  - Headquarters, Sudan Defence Force, Khartoum
  - Shendi Horse (Northern Area), Shendi
  - Equatoria Corps (Southern Area), Torit
  - Sudan Camel Corps (Central Area), El Obeid
  - Eastern Arab Corps (Eastern Area), El-Gadarif
  - Western Arab Corps (Western Area), Al-Fashir

== The Army of India ==
The British Indian Army, or as it was known in the British Army as the 'Army of India' was the collective name for all the units and commands of the army based in India (excluding Burma and Ceylon). (ISF) for Imperial Service Force.

- General Headquarters, Army of India Commanded by General Sir Robert Archibald Cassels
- Indian Army Staff College
- Indian Army Senior Officers' School
- Indian School of Artillery
- Indian Military Academy
- Indian Army School of Education
- Indian School of Weapon Training and Mechanisation
- Indian School of Chemical Warfare
- Indian Army School of Physical Training
- Indian Army Signal School
- Kitchener College
- Royal Indian Army Service School
- Indian Mechanical Transport Advisory Committee

=== Auxiliary Forces, India ===
The Auxiliary Force (India) (AFI) was a part-time, paid volunteer organisation within the Indian Army in British India. Its units were entirely made up of European and Anglo-Indian personnel.

==== Cavalry ====
- Bihar Light Horse, Muzaffarpur
- Calcutta Light Horse, Calcutta
- Surma Valley Light Horse, Silchar
- Northern Bengal Mounted Rifles, Darjeeling
- Southern Provinces Mounted Rifles, Madras
- The Chota Nagpur Regiment, Ranchi
- Assam Valley Light Horse, Dibrugarh

==== Infantry ====
- Nagpur Rifles, Nagpur
- Simla Rifles, Simla
- The Calcutta and Presidency Battalion, Calcutta
- The Nilgiri Malabar Battalion, Ootacamund
- Hyderabad Rifles, Secunderabad
- The Eastern Bengal Company, Dacca
- East Coast Battalion, Vizayapatam
- Kolar Gold Fields Battalion, Oorgaum
- The Calcutta Scottish, Caluctta
- The Coorg and Mysore Company, Mercara
- The Yercaud Company, Yercaud
- The Bhusawal Company, Bhusawal

==== Contingents ====
- Agra Contingent, Agra
  - 17th (Agra) Field Battery, Indian Artillery
  - 5th (Agra) Machine-Gun Company
- Allahabad Contingent, Allahabad
  - Detachment, The Southern Regiment (United Provinces Horse)
  - Allahabad Rifles
- Bangalore Contingent, Bangalore
  - Bangalore Armoured Car Company
  - The Bangalore Battalion
- Bareilly Corps, Bareilly
  - The Bareilly Contingent, Nainital
  - 18th (Bareilly) Field Battery, Indian Artillery
- Bombay Contingent, Bombay
  - Bombay Light Patrol
  - Bombay Battalion
  - 10th (Bombay) Battery, Indian Artillery
  - 3rd (Bombay) Fortress Company, Bombay Engineers
- Cawnpore Contingent, Cawnpore
  - Detachment, The Southern Regiment (United Provinces Horse)
  - 20th (Sawnpore) Field Battery, Indian Artillery
  - Cawnpore Rifles
- Dehra Dun Contingent, Dehradun
  - 3 Platoon, 1 W/T Section and 4 Mortar Platoons
- Delhi Contingent, Delhi
  - HQ, 1 Troop, 1 Company of Infantry, and 3 Mortar Platoons
- Karachi Corps, Karachi
  - Sind Rifles
  - 2nd (Karachi) Machine-Gun Company
  - 3 DLS Sections and 1 W/T Section
  - 2 Mortar Platoons
  - 4th (Karachi) Fortress Company, Indian Engineers
- Lucknow Contingent, Lucknow
  - Detachment, The Southern Regiment (United Provinces Horse)
  - Lucknow Rifles
  - 13th (Lucknow) Field Battery, Indian Artillery
- Madras Contingent, Madras
  - 1st (Madras) Signal Company, Indian Signals
  - Madras Guards
  - 3rd (Madras) Field Battery, Indian Artillery
- Poona Contingent, Poona
  - Poona Rifles
  - 13th (Kirkee) Field Battery, Indian Artillery Kirkee
- Punjab Contingent, Lahore
  - Punjab Light Horse
  - Punjab Rifles

==== Artillery ====
- Bengal Artillery, Indian Artillery, Barrackpore
- 1st (Calcutta Port Defence) Brigade, Indian Artillery, Calcutta
- 5th (Cossipore) Field Battery, Indian Artillery, Cossipore

==== Engineers ====
- 1st (Calcutta) Fortress Company, Indian Engineers, Calcutta

==== Railway Troops ====
- East Indian Railway Regiment
  - 1st Battalion, Liluah
  - 2nd Battalion, Lucknow
- Eastern Bengal Railway Battalion, Sealdah
- Great Indian Peninsula Railway Regiment
  - 1st Battalion, Parel
  - 2nd Battalion, Jhansi
- Bombay, Baroda, and Central India Railway Regiment
  - 1st Battalion, Lower Parel
  - 2nd Battalion, Ajmer
- Bengal and North Western Railway Battalion, Gorakhpur
- North Western Railway Battalion, Lahore
- South Indian Railway Battalion, Trichinopoly
- Madras and Southern Mahratta Railway Rifles
  - 1st Battalion, Perambur
  - 2nd Battalion, Hubli
- Bengal Nagpur Railway Battalion, Kharagpur
- Assam Bengal Railway Battalion, Chittagong

== Western District (Independent) ==
Western District encompassed the states of: Baluchistan, Sind, Khairpur State, and Rajputana.

- Western District Headquarters, Quetta commanded by Major General Thomas Jacomb Hutton
- Western District Signals, Indian Army Corps of Signals, Quetta
- 20th Mountain Regiment, Indian Artillery, Quetta
- 42nd Divisional Engineering Headquarters, Bombay Sappers and Miners, Quetta
- Quetta Area
  - Headquarters, Quetta Area, Quetta
  - 1st Battalion, The Lancashire Fusiliers, Quetta
  - 1st Battalion, 10th Gurkha Rifles, Quetta
  - 2nd Battalion, 10th Gurkha Rifles, Quetta
- Khojak Brigade
  - Headquarters, Khojak Brigade, Quetta
  - Royal Deccan Horse (9th Horse), Quetta
  - 2nd Battalion, 9th Jat Regiment, Chaman
  - 3rd Battalion, 18th Royal Garhwal Rifles, Chaman
- Zhob Brigade
  - Headquarters, Zhob Brigade, Loralai
  - Zhob Signal Section, Indian Army Corps of Signals, Loralai
  - 2nd Royal Lancers (Gardner's Horse), Loralai
  - 5th Battalion, 5th Mahratta Light Infantry, Hindubagh
  - 4th Battalion, 10th Baluch Regiment, Hindubagh
  - 1st Battalion, 2nd Gurkha Rifles, Fort Sandeman
  - 2nd Battalion, 4th Gurkha Rifles, Loralai
  - Zhob Militia, Fort Sandeman
  - 25th Mountain Regiment, Indian Artillery, Fort Sandeman
- Sind Area
  - Headquarters, Sind Area, Karachi
  - B Corps Signals, Indian Army Corps of Signals, Karachi
  - D.L.S. Signals Company, Indian Army Corps of Signals, Karachi
  - Bikaner Dungar Lancers, Bikaner (ISF)
  - Bikaner Camel Corps, Bikaner (ISF)
  - 1st Battalion, The Royal Scots Fusiliers, Karachi
  - 3rd Battalion, 7th Rajput Regiment, Hyderabad
  - 10th Battalion, 10th Baluch Regiment, Karachi
  - 3rd Battalion, 16th Punjab Regiment, Karachi
  - Bikaner Sadul Light Infantry (ISF)
  - Bikaner Machine-Gun Battalion, Bikaner (ISF)
  - Mekran Levy Corps, Panjgur (ISF)
  - 11th University Training Corps, Karachi
  - Bikaner Camel Escort, Bikaner (ISF)
  - 13th Heavy Battery, Royal Artillery, Karachi

== Northern Command ==
Northern Command comprised the areas of: The North-West Frontier Province; Waziristan District; Kashmir State; the Punjab (less districts of Rohtak and Gurgaon); the Punjab States including the Punjab Hill States [less Khairpur, Tehri (Garhwal), Pataudi, Dujana, and the Bawal District of the Nabha State.]

- Headquarters, Northern Command, Rawalpindi commanded by General Sir John Francis Stanhope Duke Coleridge

=== Kohat District ===
- Kohat District, Kohat
  - Kohat District Headquarters commanded by Major General Henry Lawrence Haughton
  - Kohat District Signals, Indian Army Corps of Signals, Kohat
  - 8th King George's Own Light Cavalry, Kohat
  - 21st Mountain Regiment, Indian Artillery, Kohat
  - 22nd Field Company, Bengal Sappers and Miners, Kohat
  - Kohat Base Supply Depot, Kohat
  - Thal Brigade
    - Headquarters, Thal Brigade
    - Detachment, Kohat District Signals, Indian Army Corps of Signals
    - 1st Battalion, 5th Mahratta Light Infantry
    - 1st Battalion, 13th Frontier Force Rifles
    - 2nd Battalion, 15th Punjab Regiment
  - Kohat Brigade
    - Headquarters, Kohat Brigade
    - Troop from 14th Prince of Wales's Own Scinde Horse
    - 2nd Battalion, 6th Rajputana Rifles
    - 5th Battalion, 8th Punjab Regiment
    - 4th Battalion, 13th Frontier Force Rifles
    - 5th Battalion, 13th Frontier Force Rifles, Latembur

=== Lahore District ===
- Lahore District, Lahore
  - Headquarters, Lahore District commanded by Major General Macan Saunders
  - Bahawalpar Lancers (ISF), Dera Nawab Sahib
  - Jind Bodyguard (ISF), Sangrur
  - 1st Patiala Lancers (ISF), Patiala
  - 2nd Patiala Lancers (ISF), Patiala
  - Sukhet (Lakshman) Cavalry (ISF), Sundar Nagar
  - 1st Bahawalpur Battalion (ISF), Dera Nawab Sahib
  - 2nd Bahawalpur Light Battalion (ISF), Dera Nawab Sahib
  - Chamba Bodyguard (ISF), Chamba
  - Chamba Battalion (ISF), Chamba
  - Faridkot Bodyguard (ISF), Faridkot
  - 1st Jund Battalion (ISF), Sangrur
  - 2nd Jind Battalion (ISF), Sangrur
  - Kapurthala Bodyguard (ISF), Kapurthala
  - 1st Kapurthala Battalion (ISF), Kapurthala
  - 2nd Kapurthala Battalion (ISF), Kapurthala
  - Maler Kotla Bodyguard (ISF), Maler Kotla
  - Nabha Akal Battalion (ISF), Nabha
  - 1st Patiala Battalion (ISF), Nabha
  - 2nd Patiala Battalion (ISF), Nabha
  - 3rd Patiala Battalion (ISF), Nabha
  - 4th Patiala Battalion (ISF), Nabha
  - Sirmoor Bodyguard (ISF), Nahan
  - Sukhet (Lakshman) Battalion (ISF), Sundar Nagar
  - Faridkot Sappers and Miners (ISF), Faridkot
  - Maler Kotla Sappers and Miners (ISF), Maler Kotla
  - Mandi Sappers and Miners (ISF), Mandi
  - Sirmoor Sappers and Miners (ISF), Nahan
  - Faridkot Sappers and Miners Depot and Reserves (ISF), Faridkot
  - Ambala Area
    - Headquarters, Ambala
    - 2nd Battalion, The East Lancashire Regiment, Kasauli
    - 3rd Battalion, 14th Punjab Regiment, Ambala
    - 10th Battalion, 15th Punjab Regiment
    - 11th (Territorial) Battalion, 15th Punjab Regiment
    - Mountain Artillery Training Centre
    - Indian Survey Section, Kakul
  - Ferozepore Area
    - Headquarters, Ferozepore
    - 12th Cavalry Training Regiment
    - 2nd Battalion, The Duke of Wellington's West Riding Regiment
    - 2nd Battalion, Alexandra, Princess of Wales's Own North Yorkshire Regiment
    - 2nd Battalion, 1st Punjab Regiment
    - 5th Battalion, 10th Baluch Regiment
    - 10th Battalion, 14th Punjab Regiment
    - U Field Battery, Royal Artillery
    - 23/24th Medium Battery, Royal Artillery
  - Jullundur Area
    - Headquarters, Jalandhar
    - 2nd Lancers (Gardner's Horse) (armoured reconnaissance)
    - 1st Battalion, The East Yorkshire Regiment
    - 10th Battalion, 17th Dogra Regiment
    - 1st Battalion, 1st Gorkha Rifles (The Malaun Regiment), Dharamshala
    - 11th (Territorial) Battalion, 17th Dogra Regiment
    - R Field Battery, Royal Artillery
  - Lahore Area
    - Headquarters, Lahore
    - 19th King George's Own Lancers
    - 1st Battalion, The Duke of Cornwall's Light Infantry
    - 10th Battalion, 8th Punjab Regiment
    - 3rd Battalion, 17th Dogra Regiment
    - 4th University Infantry Corps (ITF), Lahore
    - 15th Field Regiment, Royal Artillery
  - Sealkot Area
    - Headquarters, Sialkot
    - 3rd Carabiniers (Prince of Wales's Dragoon Guards), Khanaspur
    - 13th Duke of Connaught's Lancers (armoured reconnaissance)
    - 10th Battalion, 12th Frontier Force Regiment
    - 10th Battalion, 16th Punjab Regiment

=== Peshawar District ===
- Peshawar District, Peshawar
  - Headquarters, Peshawar District commanded by Major General Chauncey Batho Dashwood Strettell
  - Gilgit Scouts, Gilgit
  - 1st Light Tank Company, Royal Tank Regiment
  - 7th Light Tank Company, Royal Tank Regiment
  - Chitrai Force, Chitral Fort
    - 1st Battalion, 9th Jat Regiment
    - Chitral Mountain Artillery Section, Indian Artillery
    - Section, 22nd Field Company, Bombay Sappers and Miners
  - 1st (Risalpur) Cavalry Brigade
    - Headquarters and Signal Company, Royal Corps of Signals
    - 16th/5th The Queen's Royal Lancers
    - 5th King Edward's Own Probyn's Horse
    - 10th Queen Victoria's Own Corps of Guides Cavalry
    - 5th Battalion, 12th Frontier Force Regiment
  - Landi Kotal Brigade
    - Headquarters, Landi Kotal
    - Detachment, Pesawar District Signals, Indian Army Corps of Signals
    - 1st Battalion, The South Wales Borderers, Landi Kotal
    - 1st Battalion, 1st Punjab Regiment
    - 3rd Battalion, 9th Jat Regiment, Bar Fortress
    - 4th Battalion, 11th Sikh Regiment
    - 4th Battalion, 15th Punjab Regiment, Shagi
    - 2nd Battalion, 5th Gorkha Rifles (Frontier Force)
    - Kurram Militia
  - Nowshera Brigade
    - Headquarters, Nowshera
    - 4th Battalion, 5th Mahratta Light Infantry
    - 2nd Battalion, 11th Sikh Regiment
    - 10th Battalion, 11th Sikh Regiment
    - 1st Battalion, 6th Gurkha Rifles, Malakand
    - Detachment, 5th Battalion, 12th Frontier Force Regiment
    - 11th (Territorial) Battalion, 12th Frontier Force Regiment
    - 1st Field Regiment, Royal Artillery
    - 2nd Field Company, Bengal Sappers and Miners
  - Peshawar Brigade
    - Headquarters, Peshawar
    - Peshawar District Signals, Indian Army Corps of Signals
    - 16th Light Cavalry
    - 1st Battalion, The King's Liverpool Regiment
    - 3rd Battalion, 6th Rajputana Rifles
    - 4th Battalion, 8th Punjab Regiment
    - 4th Battalion, 14th Punjab Regiment
    - 2nd Battalion, 19th Hyderabad Regiment
    - 8th Anti-Aircraft Battery, Royal Artillery
    - 19th Medium Battery, Royal Artillery
    - 24th Mountain Regiment, Indian Artillery
    - 18th (Sohan) Mountain Battery, Indian Artillery

=== Rawalpindi District ===
- Rawalpindi District, Rawalpindi
  - Headquarters, Rawalpindi District commanded by Major General Alan Fleming Hartley
  - 11th (Territorial) Battalion, 13th Frontier Force Rifles
  - 73rd Field Battery, Royal Artillery, Campbellpore
  - 7x Fort Guards provided by Jammu and Kashmir Rifles (ISF)
  - 1st (Abbottabad) Infantry Brigade
    - Headquarters, Abbottabad
    - 1st Battalion, 5th Gorkha Rifles (Frontier Force)
    - 2nd Battalion, 6th Gurkha Rifles
    - 10th Battalion, 13th Frontier Force Rifles
    - 23rd Mountain Regiment, Indian Artillery
  - 2nd (Rawalpindi) Infantry Brigade
    - Headquarters, Rawalpindi
    - A Corps Signals, Indian Army Corps of Signals
    - 1st Indian Divisional Signals, Indian Army Corps of Signals
    - Headquarters Squadron, 14th Prince of Wales's Own Scinde Horse
    - 1st Battalion, The Devonshire Regiment
    - 1st Battalion, The Royal Ulster Rifles
    - 2nd Battalion, The Worcestershire Regiment
    - 2nd Battalion, 4th Bombay Grenadiers
    - 2nd Battalion, 8th Punjab Regiment
    - 4th Battalion, 12th Frontier Force Regiment
    - 5th Field Regiment, Royal Artillery
    - 5th Field Company, Bengal Sappers and Miners
    - 41st Divisional Headquarters Company, Bengal Sappers and Miners
  - 3rd (Jhelum) Infantry Brigade
    - Headquarters, Jhelum
    - 10th Battalion, 1st Punjab Regiment
    - 1st Battalion, 10th Baluch Regiment
    - 1st Battalion, 16th Punjab Regiment
    - 1st Battalion, 17th Dogra Regiment
    - 11th (Territorial) Battalion, 1st Punjab Regiment
  - Jammu Brigade (ISF)
    - Headquarters, Jammu Cantonment
    - 5th Squadron, Jammu and Kashmir Bodyguard
    - 1st Battalion, Jammu and Kashmir Rifles
    - 2nd Battalion, Jammu and Kashmir Rifles
    - 6th Battalion, Jammu and Kashmir Rifles
    - 7th Battalion, Jammu and Kashmir Rifles
    - Jammu and Kashmir Infantry Training Battalion
    - 1st Mountain Battery, Jammu and Kashmir Artillery
    - 2nd Mountain Battery, Jammu and Kashmir Artillery
    - Jammu and Kashmir Service Company
    - Jammu and Kashmir Training School
  - Kashmir Brigade (ISF)
    - Headquarters, Srinagar
    - Jammu and Kashmir Bodyguard (-5th Sqn)
    - 3rd Battalion, Jammu and Kashmir Rifles
    - 4th Battalion, Jammu and Kashmir Rifles
    - 5th Battalion, Jammu and Kashmir Light Infantry

=== Waziristan District ===
- Waziristan District, Dera Ismail Khan
  - Headquarters, Waziristan District command by Major General Edward Pellew Quinan
  - Waziristan District Signals, Indian Army Corps of Signals
  - Detachment, 2nd Battalion, 11th Sikh Regiment, Mari Indus
  - Bannu Brigade
    - Headquarters, Bannu Brigade, Bannu
    - Bannu Brigade Signals, Indian Army Corps of Signals
    - 1st Duke of York's Own Cavalry (Skinner's Horse)
    - C Squadron, 14th Prince of Wales's Own Scinde Horse
    - 5th Battalion, 1st Punjab Regiment
    - 1st Battalion, 12th Frontier Force Regiment
    - 2nd Battalion, 12th Frontier Force Regiment, Mir Ali
    - 1st Battalion, 14th Punjab Regiment
    - 1st Battalion, 4th Gorkha Rifles, Damdil
    - Tochi Scouts, Miramshah
    - Base Engineer Park
  - Razmak Brigade
    - Headquarters, Razmak Brigade, Razmak
    - Razmak Brigade Signals, Indian Army Corps of Signals
    - B Squadron, 14th Prince of Wales's Own Scinde Horse (armoured reconnaissance)
    - 11th Light Tank Company, Royal Tank Regiment
    - 1st Battalion, The Leicestershire Regiment
    - 2nd Battalion, 7th Rajput Regiment
    - 3rd Battalion, 10th Baluch Regiment
    - 5th Battalion, 11th Sikh Regiment
    - 2nd Battalion, 1st Gorkha Rifles (The Malaun Regiment)
    - 1st Battalion, 8th Gorkha Rifles
    - 25th Mountain Regiment, Royal Artillery
    - 10th Field Company, Madras Sappers and Miners
  - Wanna Brigade
    - Headquarters, Wana Brigade, Wanna
    - Detachment, Waziristan District Signals, Indian Army Corps of Signals
    - A Squadron, 14th Prince of Wales's Own Scinde Horse, Manzai
    - 2nd Battalion, 2nd Punjab Regiment
    - 3rd Battalion, 8th Punjab Regiment
    - 1st Battalion, 18th Royal Garhwal Rifles
    - 2nd Battalion, 3rd Gorkha Rifles
    - 2nd Battalion, 8th Gorkha Rifles
    - South Waziristan Scouts
    - 3rd Field Company, Bengal Sappers and Miners
    - 9th Field Company, Madras Sappers and Miners
    - 19th Field Company, Bombay Sappers and Miners

== Eastern Command ==
Eastern Command comprising: Delhi Province; Rohtak and Gurgaon districts, the United Provinces; Rajputana (less States of Jaisalmer, Jodhpur, Udaipur, Sirohi, Danta, Palanpur, Banswara, Partabgarh, Dungarpur, Shahpura, Kushalgarh, Nimbahera (Tonk); the combined Bundelkhand and Bagelkhand Agency of Central India; Piklon (Bhopal); Gwalior State (less detached Districts in Southern Command); Bihar and Orissa Province; Eastern States Agency (less States of Basar, Changbakhar, Chhuikhadan, Jashpur, Kanker, Kawardha, Khairagarh, Korea, Nandgaon, Raigarh, Sakti, Sarangarh, Surguja (Udaipur and Makrai); Bengal, Bengal States; Assam and Manipur States. Of the Punjab states; Pataudi, Dujana, Tehri (Garhwal) and the Bawal District of the Nabha State.

- Headquarters, Eastern Command, Nainital commanded by General Sir Harry Beauchamp Douglas Baird

=== Lucknow District ===
- Lucknow District, Lucknow
  - Headquarters, Lucknow District commanded by Major General Francis Lothian Nicholson
  - 1st Benares Battalion (ISF), Ramnagar
  - 2nd Benares Cavalry Squadron (ISF), Ramnagar
  - 6th (Lucknow) Infantry Brigade
    - Headquarters, 6th Inf Bde, Lucknow
    - 20th Lancers (Training Regiment)
    - 2nd Battalion, The Royal Welch Fusiliers
    - 2nd Battalion, Princess Charlotte of Wales's Royal Berkshire Regiment
    - 3rd Battalion, 2nd Punjab Regiment
    - 1st Battalion, 8th Punjab Regiment
    - 2nd Battalion, 10th Baluch Regiment, Fyzabad
    - 1st Battalion, 3rd Gorkha Rifles
    - 8th Field Regiment, Royal Artillery
  - Allahabad Area
    - Headquarters, Allahabad Area, Allahabad
    - Squadron from 3rd Cavalry
    - 1st Battalion, The Queen's Royal West Surrey Regiment
    - 2nd Battalion, The South Staffordshire Regiment, Kanpur
    - 10th Battalion, 7th Rajput Regiment
    - 11th (Territorial) Battalion, 7th Rajput Regiment, Fatehgarh
    - 3rd Battalion, 11th Sikh Regiment, Fatehgarh
    - 4th (United Provinces) Urban Battalion (ITF)
    - 3rd (United Provinces) University Training Corps (ITF)
    - X Field Battery, Royal Artillery, Kanpur
  - Delhi Area (Independent)
    - Headquarters, Delhi Area, Delhi Cantonment
    - 6th Duke of Connaught's Own Lancers (Watson's Horse)
    - Alwar Mangal Lancers (ISF), Alwar
    - Kachhawa Horse (ISF), Jaipur
    - 1st Battalion, The Royal Norfolk Regiment
    - 2nd Battalion, The Welch Regiment, Agra
    - 11th (Territorial) Battalion, 6th Rajputana Rifles, Agra
    - 2nd Battalion, 16th Punjab Regiment
    - 10th Battalion, 19th Hyderabad Regiment, Agra
    - Alwar Jey Paltan Battalion (ISF), Alwar
    - Alwar Pratap Paltan Battalion (ISF), Alwar
    - Dholpur Narsingh Battalion (ISF), Dholpur
    - Sawai Man Guards Battalion (ISF), Jaipur
    - 1st Battalion, Jaipur Infantry (ISF), Jaipur
    - 2nd Battalion, Jaipur Infantry (ISF), Jaipur
    - 1st Umed Battalion, Kotah
    - 9th (Delhi) Battalion, University Training Corps (ITF)
    - 6th Medium Regiment, Royal Artillery
    - Royal Artillery Indian Training Centre, Muttra
    - Indian Artillery Training Battery, Royal Artillery, Muttra

=== Meerut District ===
- Meerut District, Dehradun
  - Headquarters, Meerut District commanded by Major General Claude John Eyre Auchinleck
  - Rampur Lancers (Territorial), Rampur
  - Governor General's Bodyguard, Dehradun
  - Datia 1st Govind Battalion (Territorial), Datia (B Company training unit)
  - Panna Chhatrasal (Territorial), Panna
  - 1st Rampur Battalion (Territorial), Rampur
  - 2nd Rampur Battalion (Territorial), Rampur
  - Rewa Battalion (Territorial), Rewa
  - Tehri Infantry Battalion & Band (Territorial), Tehri
  - 31st Field Engineer Platoon, King George V's Own Bengal Sappers and Miners, Roorkee
  - 35th Field Engineer Platoon, King George V's Own Bengal Sappers and Miners, Roorkee
  - 4th Field Company, King George V's Own Bengal Sappers and Miners, Roorkee
  - 51st Printing Platoon, King George V's Own Bengal Sappers and Miners, Roorkee
  - 6th Army Troops Company, King George V's Own Bengal Sappers and Miners, Roorkee
  - 8th Army Troops Company, King George V's Own Bengal Sappers and Miners, Roorkee
  - 43rd Divisional Headquarters Company Company, King George V's Own Bengal Sappers and Miners, Roorkee
  - Training Battalion, King George V's Own Bengal Sappers and Miners, Roorkee
  - Tehri-Garhwal Sappers and Miners (Territorial), Tehri
  - Narendra Pioneers (Territorial), Tehri
  - 3rd (Meerut) Cavalry Brigade
    - Headquarters, 3rd Cav Bde, Meerut
    - 3rd Indian Divisional Signals, Indian Army Corps of Signals
    - 3rd Cavalry Brigade Signals, Indian Army Corps of Signals
    - 18th King Edward VIII's Own Cavalry
    - 21st King George V's Own Central India Horse (armoured reconnaissance)
    - 1st Battalion, The Royal Warwickshire Regiment
    - 10th Battalion, 2nd Punjab Regiment
    - 11th (Territorial) Battalion, 9th Jat Regiment
    - 11th Field Regiment, Royal Artillery
  - Gwalior Cavalry Brigade (ISF)
    - Headquarters, Gwailor Cav Bde
    - 1st Gwalior Lancers, Guna
    - 2nd Gwalior Lancers, Thatipur
    - 3rd Gwalior Lancers, Morar
    - B Battery, Gwalior Horse Artillery, Morar
  - 7th (Dehra Dun) Infantry Brigade
    - Headquarters, 7th Inf Bde, Dehradun
    - 2nd Battalion, 2nd Gurkha Rifles
    - 1st Battalion, 9th Gorkha Rifles
    - 2nd Battalion, 9th Gorkha Rifles
  - 8th (Bareilly) Infantry Brigade
    - Headquarters, 8th Inf Bde, Bareilly
    - 2nd Battalion, The Oxfordshire and Buckinghamshire Light Infantry
    - 10th Battalion, 9th Jat Regiment
    - 2nd Battalion, 18th Royal Garhwal Rifles
    - 10th Battalion, 18th Royal Garhwal Rifles, Lansdowne
    - 11th (Territorial) Battalion, 18th Royal Garhwal Rifles, Lansdowne
    - 84th Field Battery, Royal Artillery
  - 9th (Jhansi) Infantry Brigade
    - Headquarters, 9th Inf Bde, Jhansi
    - 15th Lancers (Training regiment)
    - 1st Battalion, The City of London Regiment (Royal Fusiliers)
    - 3rd Battalion, 1st Punjab Regiment
    - 4th Battalion, 6th Rajputana Rifles
    - 3rd Battalion, 15th Punjab Regiment
    - 11th (Territorial) Battalion, 14th Punjab Regiment
    - 25th Field Regiment, Royal Artillery
  - Gwalior Infantry Brigade (ISF)
    - Headquarters, Gwalior Inf Bde, Gwalior
    - 1st Gwalior Infantry Battalion, Lashkar Kampoo
    - 2nd Gwalior Infantry Battalion, Lashkar Kampoo
    - 3rd Gwalior Infantry Battalion, Morar
    - 4th Gwalior Infantry Battalion, Morar
    - 7th Gwalior (Training) Infantry Battalion, Morar
    - Gwalior Mountain Artillery Battery, Morar

=== Presidency & Assam District ===
- Presidency & Assam District, Jalapahar
  - Headquarters, Presidency and Assam District commanded by Major General Cecil Albert Heydeman
  - Governor General's Bodyguard (Bengal), Calcutta
  - 2nd Battalion, The Border Regiment, Calcutta
  - 1st Battalion, The Scottish Rifles (Cameronians), Barrackpore
  - 1st Battalion, The Northamptonshire Regiment, Danapur
  - 1st Battalion, 4th Bombay Grenadiers, Midnapore
  - 1st Battalion, 15th Punjab Regiment, Alipore
  - 11th (Territorial) Battalion, 19th Hyderabad Regiment, Dinapore
  - 1st Battalion, 7th Gurkha Rifles, Digboi
  - 2nd Battalion, 7th Gurkha Rifles, Shillong
  - 5th (Bengal Presidency) Urban Infantry Battalion (Territorial), Calcutta
  - 2nd (Calcutta) University Training Corps Battalion (Territorial), Calcutta
  - 7th (Patna) University Training Corps Company (Territorial), Patna
  - Tripur (Bir Bikram) Manikya Rifles (ISF), Agartala
  - Eastern Bengal Area
    - Headquarters, Eastern Bengal Area, Shillong
    - 1st Battalion, Assam Rifles, Aijal
    - 2nd Battalion, Assam Rifles, Sadiya
    - 3rd Battalion, Assam Rifles, Kohima
    - 4th Battalion, Assam Rifles, Imphal
    - 1st Battalion, 11th Sikh Regiment, Chittagong
    - 2nd Battalion, 14th Punjab Regiment, Dacca
    - 12th (Dacca) University Training Corps Company (Territorial), Dacca

== Southern Command ==
Southern Command comprised the areas of the Western India States Agency – Central India States Agency (less combined Bundelkhand and Baghelkhand Agency) – Ajmer-Merwara – Jodhpur – Udaipur, Sirohi, Danta, Palanpur, Banswara, Partabgarh, Shahpurg, Kushalgarh, Nimbahera (Tonk) and Dungarpur States of Rajputana – Ujjain, Amjhera, Shajapur, and Mandasar districts of Gwalior State – Bombay Presidency – Gujarat States Agency including Baroda State – Deccan State Agency, including Kolhapur State – Central Provinces – Bastar Changbakhar, Chhuikadan Jashpur, Kanker, Karwardho, Khairagarh, Korea, Nandgaon, Raigarh, Sakti, Sarangarh, Surguja, Udaipur and Makrai States of the Eastern States Agency – Hyderababd State, Madras Presidency – Mysore State and Madras States Agency.

- Southern Command Headquarters, Poona commanded by General Sir John Edward Spencer Brind

=== Bombay District ===
- Bombay District, Bombay
  - Headquarters, Bombay District commanded by Major General Guy de Courcy Glover
  - Bombay Governor's Bodyguard
  - Baria Subhag Risala (ISF), Devgadh Baria
  - 2nd Baroda Lancers (ISF), Baroda
  - Bhavnagar Lancers (ISF), Bhavnagar
  - Dhar Light Horse (ISF), Dharavi
  - Jodhpur Lancers (ISF), Jodhpur
  - Janagarh Lancers (ISF), Junagarh
  - Mewar Lancers (ISF), Udaipur
  - Nawanagar Lancers (ISF), Jamnagar
  - Porbandar Bodyguard (ISF), Porbandar
  - Rajpipla Bodyguard (ISF), Rajpipla
  - 2nd Battalion, The Prince of Wales's South Lancashire Volunteers
  - 11th (Territorial) Battalion, 4th Bombay Grenadiers, Ajmer
  - 3rd Battalion, 5th Mahratta Light Infantry
  - 3rd Battalion, 12th Frontier Force Regiment, Baroda
  - 1st Battalion, 19th Hyderabad Regiment, Ahmedabad
  - 2nd (Bombay Presidency) Urban Infantry Battalion (Territorial)
  - 1st (Bombay) University Training Corps (Territorial)
  - Alirajpur Pratap Battalion (ISF), Alirajpur
  - Baria Ranjit Battalion (ISF), Devgadh Baria
  - 1st Baroda Battalion (ISF), Baroda
  - 2nd Baroda Battalion (ISF), Baroda
  - Bhavnagar Battalion (ISF), Bhavnagar
  - Bhopal Sultania Battalion (ISF), Bhopal
  - Dhar Battalion (ISF), Dhar
  - Dhrangadhra Bodyguard (ISF), Dhrangadhra
  - Idar Battalion (ISF), Himatnagar
  - 1st Battalion, The Indor Regiment (ISF), Indore
  - Jodhpur Sardar Battalion (ISF), Jodhpur
  - Junagarh Battalion (ISF), Junagarh
  - Kutch Bodyguard (ISF), Bhuj
  - Kutch Battalion (ISF), Bhuj
  - Mewar Bhupal Battalion (ISF), Udaipur
  - Mewar Sajjan Battalion (ISF), Udaipur
  - Nawanagar Battalion (ISF), Jamnagar
  - Palanpur Iqbal Battalion (ISF), Palanpur
  - Porbandar Battalion (ISF), Porbandar
  - Rajpipla Battalion (ISF), Rajpipla
  - Ratlam Lokendra Rifles (ISF), Ratlam
  - Bhopal Goshar-i-Taj Own Infantry Training Company (ISF), Bhopal
  - Mewar Chupal Infantry Training Company (ISF), Udaipur
  - Indor Holkar's Mounted Escort (ISF), Indore
  - Mhow Area
    - Headquarters, Mhow Area, Mhow
    - 1st Battalion, The Lincolnshire Regiment, Nasirabad
    - 2nd Battalion, The Suffolk Regiment
    - 1st Battalion, The Prince of Wales's Own West Yorkshire Regiment, Nasirabad
    - 6th Field Regiment, Royal Artillery (cadre only)
    - 28th Field Regiment, Royal Artillery

=== Deccan District ===
- Deccan District, Bolarum
  - Headquarters, Deccan District commanded by Major General P. Gerald Scarlett
  - 4th Indian Divisional Signals, Indian Army Corps of Signals
  - 1st Hyderabad Lancers (ISF), Asif Nagar
  - 2nd Hyderabad Lancers (ISF), Golconda Fort
  - 3rd Hyderabad Lancers (ISF), Golconda Fort
  - Hyderabad Cavalry Depot Squadron (ISF), Asafnagar
  - 5th Battalion, 6th Rajputana Rifles, Secunderabad
  - 6th Battalion, 13th Frontier Force Rifles, Secunderabad
  - 1st Hyderabad Battalion (ISF), Goshamahal
  - 2nd Hyderabad Battalion (ISF), Chandrayan Gutta
  - 3rd Hyderabad Battalion (ISF), Saifabad
  - Sajian Singh Battalion (ISF), Mudhol
  - 10th (Nagpur) University Training Corps (Territorial), Nagpur
  - Hyderabad Infantry Training Company (ISF), Nampally
  - A Battery, Hyderabad Horse Artillery (ISF), Mullahalli
  - Poona Area (Independent)
    - Headquarters, Poona Area, Poona (GHQ unit)
    - 17th Queen Victoria's Own Cavalry (Poona Horse)
    - Royal Tank Regiment Depot (India), Kirkee
    - 1st Battalion, Prince Albert's Somerset Light Infantry
    - 1st Battalion, The Prince of Wales's North Staffordshire Regiment
    - 10th Battalion, 5th Mahratta Light Infantry, Belgaum
    - 11th (Territorial) Battalion, 5th Mahratta Light Infantry, Belgaum
    - 4th Battalion, 16th Punjab Regiment
    - Training Battalion, King George V's Bombay Sappers and Miners, Kirkee
    - 17th Field Company, King George V's Bombay Sappers and Miners, Kirkee
    - 20th Field Company, King George V's Bombay Sappers and Miners, Kirkee
    - 21st Field Company, King George V's Bombay Sappers and Miners, Kirkee
    - 55th Printing Section, King George V's Bombay Sappers and Miners, Kirkee
  - 4th (Secunderabad) Cavalry Brigade
    - Headquarters, 4th Cav Bde, Bolarum
    - 4th Cavalry Brigade Signal Squadron, Indian Army Corps of Signals
    - Squadron from 14th/20th King's Hussars, Secunderabad
    - 7th Light Cavalry
    - 11th Prince Albert Victor's Own Cavalry (Frontier Force)
    - 3rd Field Regiment, Royal Artillery, Trimulgherry
  - 10th (Jubbulpore) Infantry Brigade
    - Headquarters, 10th Inf Bde, Jubbulpore
    - Signal Training Centre, Royal Corps of Signals (India), Jubbulpore
    - 3rd Cavalry
    - 2nd Battalion, The King's Own Scottish Borderers
    - 1st Battalion, 2nd Punjab Regiment
    - 1st Battalion, 7th Rajput Regiment, Kamptee

=== Madras District ===
- Madras District, Bangalore
  - Headquarters, Madras District commanded by Major General Edward Felix Norton
  - Mysore Lancers Training Squadron, Bangalore
  - 2nd Mysore Training Squadron, Bangalore
  - 1st Battalion, The King's Own Royal Lancaster Regiment, Madras
  - 1st Battalion, The Duke of Edinburgh's Wiltshire Regiment
  - 1st Battalion, The Royal Inniskilling Fusiliers, Wellington
  - 5th Battalion, 7th Rajput Regiment, Cannanore
  - 2nd Battalion, 13th Frontier Force Rifles, St Thomas Mount
  - Madras Governor's Bodyguard, Madras
  - 3rd Urban Infantry Battalion (Territorial), Madras
  - 5th Battalion, University Training Corps (Territorial), Madras
  - 14th Coorg (Territorial) Battalion, 3rd Madras Regiment, Mercara
  - 12th Malabar (Territorial) Battalion, 3rd Madras Regiment, Cannanore
  - Malabar Special Police, Cannanore
  - 1st Battalion, Mysore Regiment (ISF), Bangalore
  - 3rd Battalion, Mysore Regiment (ISF), Mysore
  - Mahraja's Bodyguard, Trivandrum
  - 1st Battalion, Travancore Nair Army, Trivandrum
  - 2nd Battalion, Travancore Nair Army, Trivandrum
  - 3rd Battalion, Travancore Nair Army, Trivandrum
  - A Field Regiment, Indian Artillery
  - 32nd Field Platoon, Queen Victoria's Own Madras Sappers and Miners, Bangalore
  - 35th Field Troop, Queen Victoria's Own Madras Sappers and Miners, Bangalore
  - 12th Field Company, Queen Victoria's Own Madras Sappers and Miners, Bangalore
  - 14th Field Company, Queen Victoria's Own Madras Sappers and Miners, Bangalore
  - 11th Army Troops Company, Queen Victoria's Own Madras Sappers and Miners, Bangalore
  - 16th Army Troops Company, Queen Victoria's Own Madras Sappers and Miners, Bangalore
  - 44th Divisional Headquarters Company, Queen Victoria's Own Madras Sappers and Miners, Bangalore
  - A Depot, Queen Victoria's Own Madras Sappers and Miners, Bangalore
  - Training Battalion, Queen Victoria's Own Madras Sappers and Miners, Bangalore

== Army in Burma ==
BAF - Burma Auxiliary Forces or BFF - Burma Frontier Force

- Headquarters, Army in Burma, Rangoon commanded by Major General Donald Kenneth McLeod
- Rangoon Brigade
  - Headquarters, Rangoon Bde, Rangoon
  - 1st Battalion, The Gloucestershire Regiment, Mingaladon
  - 1st Battalion, Burma Rifles, Mingaladon
  - 12th (Territorial) Battalion, Burma Rifles, Mingaladon
  - Rangoon Battalion (BAF)
  - Tenasserim Battalion (BAF), Moulmein
  - Rangoon University Training Corps (Territorial)
  - Rangoon Field Brigade, Royal Artillery (BAF), Dry Tree Point
  - Burma Railways Engineer Battalion (BAF)
  - 1st Rangoon Military Police Battalion
  - 2nd Rangoon Military Police Battalion
- Mandalay Brigade
  - Headquarters, Mandalay Bde, Maymyo
  - 2nd Battalion, The King's Own South Yorkshire Light Infantry
  - 2nd Battalion, Burma Rifles
  - 3rd Battalion, Burma Rifles
  - 4th Battalion, Burma Rifles, Mandalay
  - 11th (Territorial) Battalion, Burma Rifles, Mandalay
  - Upper Burma Battalion (BAF)
  - Southern Shan States Battalion (BFF), Tvanggyi
  - Northern Shan States Battalion (BFF), Lashio
  - Bhamo Battalion (BFF), Bhamo
  - Chin Hills Battalion (BFF), Falam
  - Myitkyina Battalion (BFF), Myitkyina
  - Reserve Battalion (BFF), Pyawbwe
  - 2nd Mountain Battery, Indian Artillery
  - 1st Field Company, Burma Sappers and Miners
  - 13th Field Company, Madras Sappers and Miners
  - Mandalay Burma Military Police Battalion, Mandalay

== Atlantic Region ==
The Atlantic region covered: Falkland Islands, Newfoundland (still under control of the British at this point, not part of Canada yet), Saint Helena, and Bermuda.

- Falklands
  - Falkland Islands Defence Force, Port Stanley
- Newfoundland
  - Newfoundland Militia, Saint John's
- Saint Helena
  - Saint Helena Rifles
- Bermuda
  - Company detached from the 2nd Battalion, The King's Shropshire Light Infantry
  - Bermuda Volunteer Rifle Corps
    - Bermuda Volunteer Engineers (attached)
  - Bermuda Militia
  - Bermuda Militia Artillery
  - Bermuda Detachment, Royal Engineers

=== Caribbean ===
The Caribbean region covered: Barbados, Jamaica, Trinidad and Tobago, Grenada, Saint Lucia, and Saint Vincent.

- Barbados
  - Barbados Volunteer Force
- Jamaica
  - Jamaica Signal Section, Royal Corps of Signals
  - 2nd Battalion, The King's Shropshire Light Infantry (less company in Bermuda)
  - 2nd Heavy Battery, Royal Artillery, defending Kingston and Port Royal (cadre)
  - Jamaica Militia Artillery, defending Kingston and Port Royal
  - 44th Fortress Company, Royal Engineers
  - Jamaica Engineer Corps
- Leeward Islands
  - Antigua Defence Force, Antigua
  - Dominica Defence Force, Dominica
  - Montserrat Defence Force, Montserrat
  - Saint Kitts and Nevis Defence Force, Basseterre
- Trinidad
  - Trinidad Light Horse
  - Trinidad Light Infantry
  - Trinidad Volunteer Reserve of Europeans
  - Trinidad Volunteer Artillery,
- Windward Islands
  - Grenada Volunteer Corps, Grenada
  - Saint Lucia Volunteer Corps, Saint Lucia
  - Saint Vincent Volunteer Corps, Saint Vincent

=== South America ===
The South America Region covered the areas of British Guiana and British Honduras.

- British Guiana
  - British Guiana Militia
  - British Guiana Militia Artillery (defending Georgetown)
- British Hondouras (today known as Belize)
  - British Honduras Defense Force

== Mediterranean Region ==
The Mediterranean Region consisted of the colonies which were NOT part of Middle East Command. These regions included: Gibraltar, Malta, Cyprus, and Iraq.

=== Gibraltar ===
- Headquarters, British Troops on Gibraltar commanded by the Governor of Gibraltar Sir Clive Gerard Liddell
- Gibraltar Signal Section, Royal Corps of Signals
- 1st Battalion, Welsh Guards
- 2nd Battalion, The King's Liverpool Regiment
- 2nd Battalion, Prince Albert's Somerset Light Infantry
- Gibraltar Defence Force
- 31st Company, Royal Army Service Corps
- 28th Company, Royal Army Medical Corps
- Gibraltar Royal Artillery
  - HQ Gibraltar RA, South Gibraltar
  - 3rd Heavy Regiment, Royal Artillery (coastal defence)
  - 19th Heavy Anti-Aircraft Battery, Artillery
- Gibraltar Royal Engineers
  - HQ Gibraltar RE
  - 1st Fortress Company, Royal Engineers
  - 32nd Fortress Company, Royal Engineers

=== Malta ===
- Headquarters, Malta Command commanded by Governor of Malta General Sir Charles Bonham-Carter
- Malta Signal Section, Royal Corps of Signals
- 1st Battalion, The King's Own Malta Regiment, Lower Saint Elmo
- Royal Malta Artillery, Upper Saint Elmo
- 4th Malta Battery, Royal Malta Artillery
- 30th Company, Royal Army Service Corps
- 30th Company, Royal Army Medical Corps
- Malta Brigade
  - Headquarters, Malta Bde, Valletta
  - 2nd Battalion, The Devonshire Regiment
  - 1st Battalion, The Dorset Regiment
  - 2nd Battalion, The Queen's Own Royal West Kent Regiment
  - 2nd Battalion, Princess Victoria's Royal Irish Fusiliers
- Malta Royal Artillery
  - Headquarters, Malta RA
  - 4th Heavy Regiment, Royal Artillery (coastal defence)
  - 26th Anti-Tank Regiment, Royal Artillery
  - 7th Heavy Anti-Aircraft Regiment, Royal Artillery
- Malta Royal Engineers
  - Headquarters, Malta RE
  - 16th Fortress Company, Royal Engineers
  - 24th Fortress Company, Royal Engineers

=== Iraq ===
- Iraq Levies, Habbaniyah

=== Cyprus ===
- Cyprus Signal Section, Royal Corps of Signals
- C Company, 1st Battalion, The Essex Regiment, Nicosia
- D Company, 1st Battalion, The Nottinghamshire and Derbyshire Regiment (The Sherwood Foresters)

== China Command ==
China Command covered the British interests in: Hong Kong, Shanghai, and Tianjin.

- China Command, Hong Kong
  - Headquarters, China Command commanded by Governor of Hong Kong General Sir Geoffry Alexander Stafford Northcote
  - Hong Kong Command Signal Company, Royal Corps of Signals
  - 8th Heavy Regiment, Royal Artillery, Kowloon (including X Bty from the HKSRA)
  - 1st Regiment, Hong Kong and Singapore Royal Artillery, Kowloon
  - 5th Heavy Anti-Aircraft Regiment, Royal Artillery, RAF Kai Tak
  - 22nd Fortress Company, Royal Engineers (serving Shenzhen River)
  - 40th Fortress Company, Royal Engineers (serving the Harbour Installations)
  - 10th Company, Royal Army Service Corps
  - 6th Company, Royal Army Ordnance Corps
  - 27th Company, Royal Army Medical Corps
  - Hong Kong Infantry Brigade
    - Headquarters, Hong Kong Inf Bde, Hong Kong
    - 2nd Battalion, The Royal Scots (Lothian Regiment)
    - Kumaon Rifles
    - 1st Battalion, The Duke of Cambridge's Own Middlesex Regiment, Sham Shui Po (machine-gun)
  - Hong Kong Volunteer Defence Corps
    - Hong Kong Volunteer Defence Corps Signal Company
    - Hong Kong Volunteer Defence Corps Armoured Car Platoon
    - 1st Company, Hong Kong Volunteer Defence Corps, RAF Kai Tak
    - 2nd (Scottish) Company, Hong Kong Volunteer Defence Corps, Sheko
    - 3rd (Eurasian) Company, Hong Kong Volunteer Defence Corps, Stonecutters Island
    - 4th (Chinese) Company, Hong Kong Volunteer Defence Corps, High West
    - 5th Company, Hong Kong Volunteer Defence Corps, Mount Davis
    - 6th (Portuguese) Company, Hong Kong Volunteer Defence Corps, North Shin Naval Yard
    - 7th Company, Hong Kong Volunteer Defence Corps, Magasin Gap
    - Stanley Platoon, Hong Kong Volunteer Defence Corps, Stanley
    - The Hugh's Group (Highsiliers), Hong Kong Volunteer Defence Corps, Northern Point
    - 1st Battery, Hong Kong Volunteer Defence Corps, Cape D'Aguilar
    - 2nd Battery, Hong Kong Volunteer Defence Corps, Bluff Head
    - 3rd Battery, Hong Kong Volunteer Defence Corps, Aberdeen Island
    - 4th Battery, Hong Kong Volunteer Defence Corps, Pak Sha Wan
    - 5th (Anti-Aircraft) Battery, Hong Kong Volunteer Defence Corps, Sai Wan Hill
    - Field Engineer Company, Hong Kong Volunteer Defence Corps, Fanling
    - Army Service Corps Company, Hong Kong Volunteer Defence Corps, Deepwater Bay

=== Shanghai Area ===
- Shanghai Area, Shanghai
  - Headquarters, Shanghai Area commanded by Major General Frank Keith Simmons
  - Shanghai Area Signal Section, Royal Corps of Signals
  - 1st Battalion, The Duke of Albany's Seaforth Highlanders (Ross-shire Buffs)
  - 2nd Battalion, The East Surrey Regiment
  - Shanghai Area Detachment, Royal Engineers
  - Shanghai Volunteer Corps
    - Headquarters, Shanghai Volunteer Corps, Shanghai
    - Shanghai Light Horse
    - American Troop (cavalry)
    - Armoured Car Company
    - A (British) Company, Mih-Ho-Loong Rifles
    - Jewish Company
    - American Company
    - Portuguese Company
    - Philippine Company
    - Japanese Company
    - Interpreter Company (Chinese)
    - Shangai Russian Regiment, 'C' Battalion
    - B (British) Company
    - H (Reserve) Company
    - Shanghai Scottish Company
    - 'C' Machine-Gun Company
    - Light Automatic (Air Defence) Company
    - Shanghai Field Company (engineers)
    - Transport Company

=== Tientsin Area ===
- Tientsin Area, Tianjin (then romanized as Tientsin)
  - Headquarters, Tientsin Area commanded by Brigadier John Emilius Laurie, 6th Baronet
  - Tientsin Area Signal Section, Royal Corps of Signals
  - 1st Battalion, The Durham Light Infantry
    - A Company + Platoon, Beijing
  - Tientsin Area Detachment, Royal Engineers

== Malaya Command ==
Malaya Command covered British Malaya, British Singapore, and British Borneo.

- Malaya Command, Singapore commanded by Lieutenant General Lionel Bond
  - Headquarters, Malaya Command
  - 2nd Battalion, 17th Dogra Regiment, Taiping
  - Malay Regiment
  - 4th Battalion, Straits Settlements Volunteer Force, Malacca
  - Jahore Volunteer Force, Johor Bahru
  - Sultan Idris Infantry Company
  - Kedah Volunteer Force Company, Alor Setar
  - Kelantan Volunteer Force Company, Kota Bharu
  - Perak Rivers Infantry Platoon
  - 50th Company, Royal Army Service Corps
  - 14th Company, Royal Army Ordnance Corps
  - 32nd Company, Royal Army Medical Corps

=== Penang Fortress ===
- Penang Fortress, Fort Cornwallis
  - Headquarters, Penang Fortress
  - Penang Fortress Signal Section, Royal Corps of Signals
  - 5th Battalion, 14th Punjab Regiment
  - 3rd Battalion, Straits Settlements Volunteer Force
  - 8th Heavy Battery, Hong Kong and Singapore Royal Artillery
  - 36th Fortress Company, Royal Engineers

=== Federated Malay States Volunteer Force ===
- Federated Malay States Volunteer Force, Port Dickson
  - Headquarters, Volunteer Forces
  - Federated Malay States Volunteer Force Signal Section
  - Federated Malay States Volunteer Force Armoured Car Squadron, Ipoh
  - 1st Battalion, Federated Malay States Volunteer Force, Ipoh
  - 2nd Battalion, Federated Malay States Volunteer Force, Kuala Lumpur
  - 3rd Battalion, Federated Malay States Volunteer Force, Seremban
  - 4th Battalion, Federated Malay States Volunteer Force, Kuantan
  - Light Field Battery, Federated Malay States Volunteer Force, Kuala Lumpur
  - Federated Malay States Volunteer Force Engineer Company

=== Singapore Fortress ===
- Singapore Fortress, Singapore
  - Headquarters, Singapore Fortress
  - Malay Signal Company, Royal Corps of Signals
  - 7th Heavy Regiment, Royal Artillery, Blakang Mati (coastal defence)
    - 5th and 7th Hvy Btys, Hong Kong and Singapore Royal Artillery attached
  - 9th Heavy Regiment, Royal Artillery, Changi (coastal defence)
  - Straits Settlements Volunteer Force Armoured Car Company
  - 1st Battalion, Straits Settlements Volunteer Force
  - 2nd Battalion, Straits Settlements Volunteer Force
  - Singapore Field Battery, Straits Settlements Volunteer Force
  - Singapore Field Engineer Company, Straits Settlements Volunteer Force
  - Singapore Fortress Engineer Company, Straits Settlements Volunteer Force
  - Malaya Infantry Brigade
    - Headquarters, Malaya Inf Bde, Singapore
    - 2nd Battalion, The Loyal North Lancashire Regiment
    - 2nd Battalion, Gordon Highlanders, Changi
    - 1st Battalion, The Manchester Regiment (machine-gun)
  - 12th Indian Infantry Brigade
    - Headquarters, 12th Indian Inf Bde, Singapore
    - 2nd Battalion, Princess Louises's Argyll and Sutherland Highlanders
    - 5th Battalion, 2nd Punjab Regiment
    - 4th Battalion, 19th Hyderabad Regiment
    - 22nd Mountain Regiment, Indian Artillery
    - 15th Field Company, Bombay Sappers and Miners
  - Malaya Air Defences
    - Headquarters, Malaya Air Defences, Singapore
    - 1st Anti-Aircraft Regiment, The Hong Kong and Singapore Artillery
    - 2nd Anti-Aircraft Regiment, The Hong Kong and Singapore Artillery
    - 3rd Anti-Aircraft Regiment, The Hong Kong and Singapore Artillery
  - Singapore Fortress Royal Engineers
    - Singapore Fortress Royal Engineers Headquarters, Singapore
    - 30th Fortress Company, Royal Engineers
    - 34th Fortress Company, Royal Engineers
    - 35th Fortress Company, Royal Engineers
    - 41st Fortress Company, Royal Engineers

== Indian Ocean ==
The Indian Ocean area covered the islands of Ceylon and Mauritius.

=== Ceylon ===
- Ceylon Defence Force, Colombo
  - Headquarters, Ceylon Defence Force commanded by Governor of Ceylon Sir Andrew Caldecott
  - Ceylon Signal Section, Royal Corps of Signals
  - Ceylon Mounted Rifles, Kandy
  - Ceylon Planters' Rifle Corps, Kandy
  - Ceylon Light Infantry
  - Ceylon Cadet Battalion
  - 6th Heavy Regiment, Royal Artillery, Trincomalee
    - 14th HAA Bty attached
  - Ceylon Garrison Artillery (Volunteers)
  - 31st Fortress Company, Royal Engineers
  - Ceylon Engineer Company

=== Mauritius ===
- British Troops on Mauritius, Port Louis
  - Headquarters, British Troops on Mauritius commanded by Governor of Mauritius Sir Bede Edward Hugh Clifford
  - Mauritius Signal Section, Royal Corps of Signals
  - Mauritius Territorial Force, Rodrigues
  - 25th Heavy Battery, Royal Artillery
  - 43rd Fortress Company, Royal Engineers

== Pacific Ocean Region ==
The Pacific Ocean region comprised the areas of: Fiji, Sarawak, and the Gilbert and Ellice Islands Colony.

- Fiji
  - Headquarters, Fiji Defences Forces, Suva
  - Fiji Defence Force Signals
  - 1st Battalion, The Fiji Infantry Regiment
- Sarawak
  - Sarawak Rangers
  - Sarawak Armed Police
- Gilbert and Ellice Islands Colony
  - Ocean Island Defence Force, Ocean Island

== Royal West African Frontier Force ==
The Royal West African Frontier Force or also known as the West African Force comprised troops from the areas of Colony of Nigeria, Gold Coast Protectorate, Colony of Sierra Leone, Gambia Protectorate, and the Cameroons Mandate.

- Royal West African Frontier Force Headquarters commanded by Brigadier Collen Edward Melville Richards
  - Gold Coast Signal Section
  - Nigerian Signal Company, Zaria
  - 4th Battalion, The Nigeria Regiment, Ibadan
  - 5th Battalion, The Nigeria Regiment, Zaria
  - The Gold Coast Regiment (SR)
  - The Gambia Company, Cape Saint Mary
  - B Company, 3rd Battalion, The Nigeria Regiment, Victoria
  - Gold Coast Defence Force
  - Lagos Defence Force, Lagos
  - 1st Light Nigerian Field Battery, Zaria
  - Light Gold Coast Field Battery, Accra
  - European Reserve Force Engineer Cadre, Logos
  - 1st West African Infantry Brigade
    - Headquarters, 1st West African Inf Bde, Kaduna
    - 1st Battalion, The Nigeria Regiment, Kaduna
    - 2nd Battalion, The Nigeria Regiment, Kano
    - 3rd Battalion, The Nigeria Regiment, Enugu (-B Co)
  - 4th Gold Coast Infantry Brigade
    - Headquarters, 4th Gold Coast Inf Bde, Kumasi
    - 1st Battalion, The Gold Coast Regiment, Kumasi
    - 2nd Battalion, The Gold Coast Regiment, Tamale
    - 3rd (Territorial) Battalion, The Gold Coast Regiment, Winneba
  - Sierra Leone Brigade
    - Headquarters, Sierra Leone Bde, Freetown
    - Sierra Leone Signal Section, Royal Corps of Signals
    - Sierra Leone Regiment
    - Sierra Leone Heavy Battery, Royal Artillery (Coastal defence)
    - 39th Fortress Company, Royal Engineers

== East African Force ==
General Officer Commanding East African Force was responsible for War Office supervision of troops for the Uganda Protectorate, Kenya Colony, Tanganyika Mandate, Northern Rhodesia Protectorate, Southern Rhodesia Colony, and Nyasaland Protectorate.

Major General Douglas Dickinson commanded the force from his headquarters in Nairobi.

Directly responsible to HQ EAF:

- East African Signals
- 1st Battalion, The Northern Rhodesia Regiment, Bwana Mkubwa
- 1st Battalion, The Rhodesian Regiment, Salisbury
- 2nd Battalion, The Rhodesian Regiment, Bulawayo
- 7th (Uganda Territorial Force) Battalion, The King's African Rifles, Bombo
- C Company, 2nd (Kenya) Battalion, The King's African Rifles, Zomba
- Nyasaland Volunteer Reserve, Zomba
- East African Supplies and Transport Depot Company
- 1st (East African) Infantry Brigade
  - Headquarters Nairobi
  - Northern Area Signal Company
  - 3rd (Kenya) Battalion, The King's African Rifles
  - 4th (Uganda) Battalion, The King's African Rifles, Mombasa
  - 5th (Kenya) Battalion, The King's African Rifles, Meru
  - 1st Battalion, The Kenyan Regiment
  - Coast Defence Infantry Company, King's African Rifles, Mombasa
  - Kenya Defence Force
  - 22nd Mountain Battery, Indian Artillery (en-route)
- Southern Infantry Brigade
  - Headquarters Dar es Salaam
  - Southern Area Signal Company
  - 1st (Tanganiyka Territory) Battalion, The King's African Rifles, Tabora
  - 2nd (Nyasaland) Battalion, The King's African Rifles, Iringa
  - 6th (Tanganiyka Territory) Battalion, The King's African Rifles

== Bibliography ==
- J.B.M. Frederick, Lineage Book of British Land Forces 1660-1978, Volume I, 1984: Microform Academic Publishers, Wakefield. ISBN 1-85117-007-3.
- J.B.M. Frederick, Lineage Book of British Land Forces 1660-1978, Volume II, 1984: Microform Academic Publishers, Wakefield. ISBN 1-85117-008-1.
- Charles D. Pettibone, The Organization and Order of Battle of Militaries in World War II, Volume II - The British Commonwealth Trafford Publishing, Victoria, Canada/Rochester, United States. 2006. ISBN 978-1-85532-168-7.
- H. F. Joslen, Orders of Battle; Second World War 1939-1945, Reprinted in Middletown, Delaware by Permission of Her Majesty's Stationery Office, London, United Kingdom, (1960 edition), 2009, (re-printed, 2019). ISBN 978-1-84176-052-0.
- Normand E. H. Litchfield, The Territorial Artillery 1908 - 1988, 1992: The Sherwood Press, Nottingham, UK. ISBN 978-0754829881.
- Cliff Lord & Graham E. Watson, The Royal Corps of Signals: Unit Histories of the Corps (1920–2001) and its Antecedents, Helion & Company, Solihull, UK, 2002. ISBN 9781874622925.
- Major General Reginald Francis Heaton Nalder, The Royal Corps of Signals: A History of its Antecedents and Development, Royal Signals Institution, London, 1955. ISBN 978-0950121826.
- Dr. Leo Niehorster, British Army, 3 September 1939
- Rob Palmer, British Army Military History Website.
- Brigadier N.W. Routledge, History of the Royal Regiment of Artillery: Anti-Aircraft Artillery 1914–55, London: Royal Artillery Institution/Brassey's, 1994. ISBN 978-1843424741.
- The Monthly Army List, September 1939.
- The Monthly Army List, October 1939.
- Watson, Graham E; Rinaldi, Richard A (2018), The Corps of Royal Engineers: Organization and Units 1889–2018, United States: Tiger Lily Books, ISBN 9781717901804.
