= 47th (London) Signal Regiment =

47th (2nd London) Divisional Signals 2nd (London) Corps Signals 5th (London) Corps Signals 47 (London) Signal Regiment
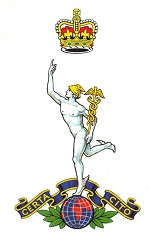
- Badge from the Royal Corps of Signals
- Active: 1920–1961
- Country: United Kingdom
- Branch: Territorial Army
- Role: Signals
- Part of: 47th (2nd London) Division; II Corps; V Corps
- Garrison/HQ: Fulham House
- Engagements: Battle of France; Operation Torch; Italian Campaign; Greek Civil War

47 (London) Signal Regiment was a Territorial Army (TA) unit of the British Army's Royal Corps of Signals. It had its origins in an engineer company and a cyclist battalion of the former Territorial Force that were amalgamated in 1920. It provided corps signal units during and after World War II. Following a series of postwar mergers Its successors continue in the Army Reserve today.

== Origin ==
When the Royal Corps of Signals (RCS) was created in 1920, the 47th (2nd London) Divisional Signals (Note: Divisional signal units of the Royal Signals 1920–45 were battalion-sized and commanded by a Lieutenant-Colonel; they were not termed 'regiments' until 1946.) was formed in the Territorial Army (TA). It combined the former 47th (2nd London) Signal Company of the Royal Engineers (RE) with the 25th (County of London) Cyclist Battalion of the London Regiment.

=== Signal Company ===
When the old Volunteer Force was subsumed into the Territorial Force (TF) after the Haldane reforms in 1908, the 1st Middlesex Royal Engineers (Volunteers) provided the RE components of the TF's 2nd London Division, including the 2nd London Divisional Telegraph Company, RE, with the following organisation:

- Company HQ at Duke of York's Headquarters, Chelsea
- No 1 Section, Duke of York's Headquarters
- No 2 (4th London) Section
- No 3 (5th London) Section
- No 4 (6th London) Section

Nos 2–4 Sections were attached to and largely manned by the 4th–6th infantry brigades of the division.

The company (termed a signal company from 1910) served with 47th (1/2nd London) Division on the Western Front during World War I and spun off a 2nd Line unit for 60th (2/2nd London) Division, which served in Salonika and Palestine.

=== Cyclist Battalion ===
The first Bicycle infantry in the British Army were the 26th Middlesex (Cyclist) Volunteer Corps, formed on 1 April 1888 by a group of enthusiastic cyclists. On the formation of the TF, it became 25th (County of London) Cyclist Battalion of the London Regiment. It served in coast defence during the early part of World War I, but in February 1916 it sailed for India, leaving its 2nd Line battalion to continue the coast defence duties. In 1917, the battalion joined the Waziristan Field Force as infantry and took part in the Waziristan Campaign of that year. In April 1919, it was on security duty at Amritsar at the time of the Jallianwala Bagh massacre, then from May to August took part in the Third Afghan War, including the Relief of Thall, before finally being demobilised almost a year after the end of World War I.

== Interwar ==
In 1920, the RE Signal Service became the independent Royal Corps of Signals (RCS). 47th (2nd London) Signal Company merged with the 25th (County of London) Cyclist Battalion, and the combined 47th (2nd London) Divisional Signals established its HQ at the Cyclists' drill hall at Fulham House in Fulham. It also administered a number of other TA and Supplementary Reserve (SR) signal units based at Fulham House:

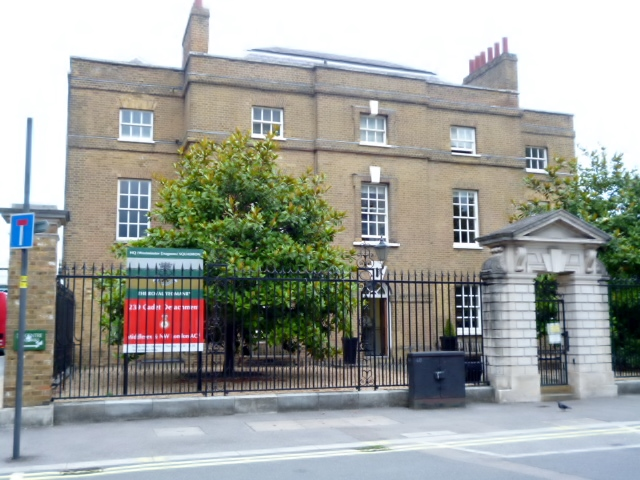
Fulham House

- 204th Medium Artillery Signal Section (TA)
- No 22 (London) Cable Section (SR)
- No 25 (London) Construction Section (SR)
- No 1 (London) Air Wing Signal Section (SR)
- No 10 (London) Air Squadron Signal Section (SR)

The first Commanding Officer (CO) was Lieutenant-Colonel William Fox Bruce, DSO, MC, who had been captured during the German Spring Offensive of 1918 while commanding 47th Signal Company.

To meet the growing threat of air attack, a number of TA units began to be converted to the anti-aircraft (AA) role during the 1930s. On 16 December 1935, 47th (2nd London) Divisional HQ was redesignated 1st AA Division (for which London District Signals provided the communications), while 47th Divisional Signals became London Corps Signals. London Corps Signals also administered 204th Medium Regiment and 206th Field Regiment Signal Sections (TA) and 2 (London) Company Air Formation Signals (SR), and had A Company, 1st West London Cadet Corps affiliated to it.

== World War II ==
=== Mobilisation ===
When the TA was doubled in size in early 1939 after the Munich Crisis, the unit split to form 1st and 2nd (London) Corps Signals. However, on the outbreak of war, these were redesignated, the 1st Line unit joining Lt-Gen Alan Brooke's II Corps with the British Expeditionary Force (BEF) as 2nd (London) Corps Signals, while the 2nd Line unit was earmarked for IV Corps in 1940 but became 5th (London) Corps Signals. (Note: A new 47th (London) Division was organised in 1939; its signals were provided by a duplicate unit formed by 56th (London) Divisional Signals.)

==== Organisation ====
In 1939, the organisation of a corps signal unit was as follows:

- HQ
- 1 Company - for construction
  - 4 line-laying sections
  - 1 line maintenance section
- 2 Company – operating
  - 3 operating sections
  - 3 wireless sections
  - 2 messenger sections (each of 1 Sergeant and 24 despatch riders)
- 3 Company – corps artillery
  - 1 section for each artillery regiment

In 1941, 1 Company supported the Main Corps HQ and 2 Company supported Rear HQ. By 1943 corps signal units had disbanded their third company and divided its duties between signal troops assigned to individual artillery regiments and the new Army Groups Royal Artillery (AGRAs). Finally, in 1944, 1 and 2 Companies supported Main HQ, a new 3 Company was formed for line construction and a new 4 Company supported Rear HQ.

=== 2nd (London) Corps Signals ===
The unit was warned for mobilisation on 4 August 1939 and was embodied at Fulham House on 25 August. It moved to Ludgershall, Wiltshire, on 1 September, from where all soldiers under the age of 19 were returned to Fulham House to join the 2nd Line unit still being formed. 2nd (L) Corps Signals returned to Sutton, London, on 14 September and completed its war establishment. It embarked for France to join the BEF on 29 September. In December 1939 and January 1940 it was joined by Nos 10 and 11 Line Sections provided by the 2nd Line unit.

==== Battle of France ====
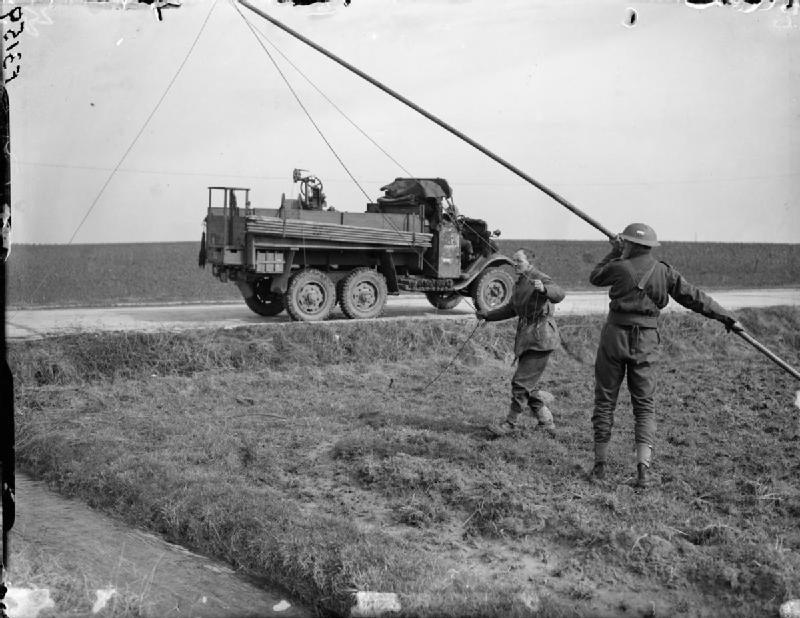
A Royal Signals cable-laying party using poles to cross a road in France.

Once concentrated, II Corps moved on 12 October up to the French frontier. When the German offensive in the west opened on 10 May 1940. The BEF advanced into Belgium in accordance with 'Plan D'. However, the German Army broke through the Ardennes to the east, forcing the BEF to withdraw again, by 19 May the whole force was back across the Escaut and then went back to the so-called 'Canal Line'.

By 26 May, the BEF was cut off and the decision was made to evacuate it through Dunkirk (Operation Dynamo), with II Corps acting as flank guard against the German penetration where the Belgian Army had surrendered. The last of the BEF who could enter the Dunkirk bridgehead had done so by 29 May and the evacuation progressed: III Corps went first, followed by II Corps after handing over responsibility for the eastern flank to the rearguards of I Corps. Most of II Corps was evacuated on the night of 31 May/1 June.

After evacuation, the signal unit was due to return to France as part of the Second BEF that was being organised, but on the surrender of France it was instead sent to Northern Ireland as 6th (London) Corps Signals. (Note: There was no VI Corps at this time.)

==== Middle East and Mediterranean ====
In 1941, the unit was redesignated again as 3rd (London) Corps Signals and sent to join Middle East Forces. At this time, III Corps was a deception HQ in Persia and Iraq Command (Paiforce). In 1942, 3rd (L) Corps Signals spun off a separate 21st Corps Signals for Paiforce. This unit later became Eastern Command Signals in India and was disbanded on Indian independence in 1947. 3rd (L) Corps Signals also spun off 3 Army Signals, which served in the Middle East for the rest of the war.

In 1944, 3rd (L) Corps Signals was reorganised as No 18 Line of Communication Signals and sent to the Italian Front. After 1943, a Line of Communication signal unit was intended to be organised as follows:

- 1 HQ signal troop
- 6 construction troops
- 2 terminal equipment troops
- 6 telegraph operating troops
- 4 despatch rider troops
- 2 technical maintenance troops
- 4 medium wireless troops
- 2 telephone switchboard
- 2 cipher troops

After a short spell in Italy, 18 LoC Signals served in Greece during the British occupation and civil war that followed the German withdrawal. The unit was demobilised there in 1946.

=== 5th (London) Corps Signals ===
V Corps' formation sign during World War II

While the 1st Line unit went to France, the 2nd Line continued to absorb recruits and train at Fulham House and various locations round Putney and Wandsworth. During the winter, it sent 10 and 11 Line Sections to join 2nd Corps, and in April 1940 it provided a cadre of 150 men to form 7th Corps Signals. Also, in April, five of its sections (5 Line Maintenance, 9 Wireless, 13 Operating and 25 and 28 Line Sections) were mobilised for overseas service, though this did not happen. In early May, some subunits were detached for training to South Shields and Portsmouth, and on their return the whole unit (six officers and 250 other ranks) moved to Old Dean Common Camp in Aldershot Command and then to Minley Manor, which it shared with 4th (North Midland) Corps Signals. The intention was that the London unit would take over as 4th Corps Signals while the North Midland unit would join the North Western Expeditionary Force (NWEF) in the Norwegian campaign. However, the evacuations from Norway and France disrupted all arrangements: both units provided personnel to reform 2nd (L) Corps Signals after its evacuation from Dunkirk (see above) and 5th (L) Corps Signals resumed its title.

V Corps HQ under Lt-Gen Claude Auchinleck was formed from the NWEF HQ on 17 June 1940 at Tidworth Camp, Wiltshire, in Southern Command. Here, it was joined by 5th (L) Corps Signals, initially accommodated at Bhurtpore Barracks and in a tented camp. Within a month, Corps HQ was established at Melchett Court, near Salisbury, and 5th (L) Corps Signals at Cowesfield House, fully cabled, with the wireless sections at Deanhill Farm ('Radio City'), a pigeon loft at Redlynch, and a Rear HQ signals office at Romsey. V Corps HQ was responsible for operational control and coast defence in Hampshire and Dorset, and had to respond to numerous false invasion alarms during the summer of 1940. Lieutenant-General Bernard Montgomery took over as General Officer Commanding (GOC) V Corps on 21 July 1940, and emphasised mobility for all units and HQs in its training exercises. The new GOC was ruthless in replacing officers who did not match up to his standards for fitness and ability.

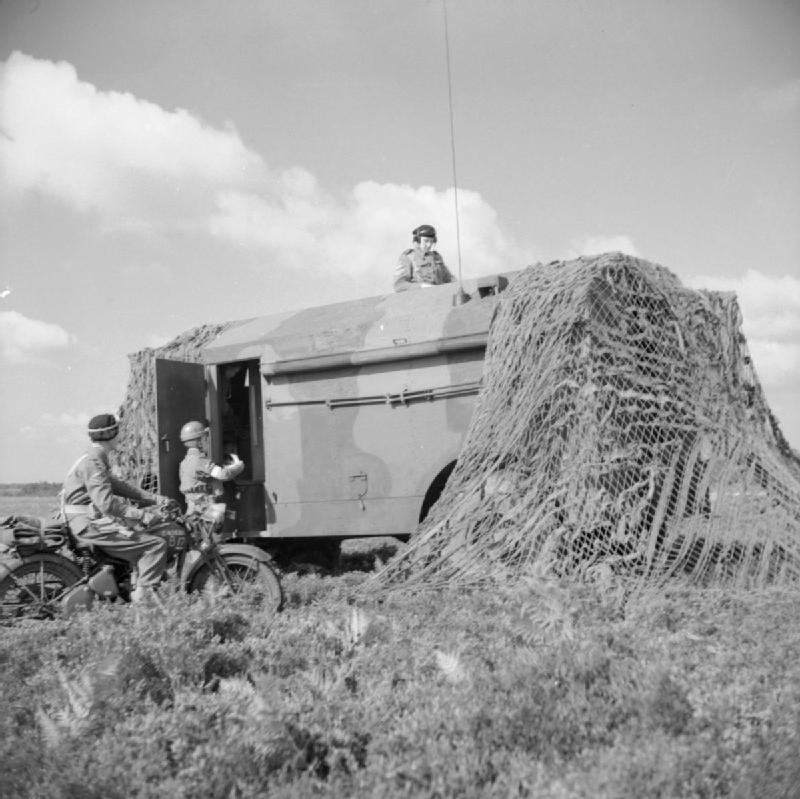
An AEC armoured command vehicle on exercise

V Corps HQ moved to Longford Castle, still near Salisbury, in mid-September 1940, and 5th (L) Corps Signals was distributed in surrounding parts of Wiltshire and Hampshire as follows:

- HQ at Alderbury
- 1 Company at Whiteparish, Odstock, and West and East Dean, the remainder at Cowesfield House with the Technical Maintenance Section
- 2 Company at Bodenham, Nunton, Farley and West Grimstead, with an element at Alderbury
- 3 Company at Nomansland
- Telephone exchange at Downton with V Corps' Rear HQ

The unit remained in this area until 1942, with frequent exercises of increasing complexity, 5th (L) Corps Signals deploying the new AEC armoured command vehicle (EVC). In June 1942, V Corps was designated for Operation Torch, the Allied invasion of North Africa, and came under the command of First Army. V Corps HQ (now under Lt-Gen Charles Allfrey as GOC) and signals relocated to Hamilton Park Racecourse in Scotland, where a series of embarkation and communication exercises were held. The ACVs were deemed unsuitable for North West Africa, and the signal equipment was transferred to soft-skin lorry command vehicles (LCVs). Then, between 4 and 10 November, the unit moved to Leith and Gourock to embark for the Torch convoys, with the following organisation:

- 5th (London) Corps Signals HQ
- 1, 2, 3 Company HQs
- 5 Technical Maintenance Section
- 25, 28, 35 Line Maintenance Sections
- 52 Line Maintenance Section (later 52 Terminal Equipment Section)
- 13, 51 Operating Sections
- 15 Operating Section (later 163 Tele-Operating Section)
- 9, 10, 88 Wireless Telegraphy (W/T) Sections (including despatch riders and operating as Advanced and Rear Corps HQ operating sections)
- 5 Corps Artillery Signal Section
- 8 Cipher Section
- 42 Signal Park (served all signal units in V Corps, closely associated with the unit though not formally part of it)
- Light Aid Detachment, Royal Electrical and Mechanical Engineers (REME)

==== Operation Torch ====
The Allied landings began on 8 November 1942 and the first section of 5th (L) Corps Signals landed at Algiers from SS Reina del Pacifico in Convoy KMS3 on 22 November. The rest of the unit followed on convoys KMS4 and KMS5, with the transport arriving on 27 November. Temporary Corps HQ and signals were established north of the city, and an advanced HQ at Ferme Fabre between Souk el Arba and Souk El Khemis in Tunisia. The first 5th (L) Corps Signals road convoy left Algiers at 07.40 on 1 December with some 250 personnel and drove hundreds of miles eastwards, reaching Ferme Fabre on 4 December, where the signal centre was established. V Corps HQ took over the front on 6 December. Wireless links were quickly established to First Army and 78th Division. Next day, the civilian telephone network was utilised for links to First Army Command Post, and shortly afterwards wireless links were established to 6th Armoured Division and 'Blade Force'.

By now, the Axis forces had reacted strongly to the invasion and First Army's drive towards Tunis had been halted in the mountains, with V Corps engaged in hard fighting round Longstop Hill. For the next four months, a series of actions was fought along this static line, and an extensive network of signal cables to formation HQs was repaired and laid, despite frequent breaks caused by air raids. 25 Line Section working in the forward areas had to be withdrawn following probes by enemy patrols. Corps Signal Office was established in a storm water culvert under a road, known as 'The Drain'. By May 1943, V Corps was poised for a final advance on Tunis, with the line sections working forwards along the two main axes of advance for 78th Division and 4th Division. Signals personnel helping the Royal Engineers clear minefields along these axes suffered several casualties. Rapid progress was made after Operation Strike was launched on 6 May, and 78th Division entered Tunis on 8 May; V Corps HQ moved up to Massicault the same day. The Tunisian campaign ended on 13 May and on 14 May Corps HQ and Signals moved into Carthage. Work continued to restore cable links and remove mines, but on 15 June the unit handed over its communication network to 1st Army Signals and moved west to rejoin V Corps HQ at Constantine.

==== Italian Campaign ====
V Corps was not involved in the subsequent Allied invasion of Sicily (Operation Husky) but was responsible for administering a number of units in North Africa. 5th (L) Corps Signals collected new equipment and undertook training, as well as lending sections to 15th Army Group HQ. At the end of August, it received its orders for the Allied invasion of mainland Italy. On 11 September, V Corps' Tactical HQ and Tactical Signals moved to Bizerta and embarked to join Eighth Army at Taranto; the rest of the unit moved to Philipeville on 16 September for embarkation. The main signal elements arrived on 20 September without their transport and set up in a grove some 5 miles (8.0 km) north of Taranto. The first ship carrying half the vehicles and equipment reached Brindisi on 27 September, but of the second ship, Ocean Stranger there was no sign. It had arrived at Salerno on the other side of Italy, where fighting was still going on and was at first unable to unload. 5th (L) Corps Signals was finally united at Canosa on 3 October.

On 10 October, the unit moved up to Serracapriola and began establishing communications for the formations under corps command. Away from the coastal railway, civil telephone lines were sparse, and the unit soon used up all the telephone poles in 42 Signal Park. Although power control circuits along the electricity supply pylons up the valleys could also be used, V Corps was faced with the necessity of greater use of wireless. By the end of October, the unit's rear elements had joined from North Africa, on 2 November, following the crossing of the Trigno, it moved up to Termoli and on 8 November to Vasto. V Corps' next task was to cross the Sangro and tackle the Germans' Gustav Line. During the preparations, the line sections had to instal cable down to the river under artillery fire, but the attack on 28–29 November succeeded, and cables were laid across the bridges laid by the Royal Engineers. Bad weather hampered further advances, but after 1st Canadian Division took Ortona, V Corps HQ moved forward to San Vito Chietino on 27 December, and then to Rocca San Giovanni on 3 January, remaining there until the end of the month.

The Adriatic front in Italy was virtually shut down for winter, and at the end of January V Corps HQ and Signals was withdrawn to a rest area near Naples, though the signal unit lent a detachment to reinforce 2nd New Zealand Division's signallers in the Battle of Monte Cassino, which suffered some casualties. The Corps HQ returned to take over the Adriatic Front once more at the end of February, located at Paglieta. Directly under the command of Allied Armies in Italy (AAI), V Corps' task was to hold the front with the minimum number of troops and harass the enemy, while Eighth Army moved westwards. 5th (L) Signals maintained dummy signals traffic to conceal Eighth Army's move. While the front was static, the unit received new equipment, including teleprinters, and Jeeps to replace 15 cwt trucks, cars and motorcycles that were frequently stuck in mud. It also established line communications with Hermon Force, a mixed force operating high in the mountains with Pack transport. On 17 June, V Corps HQ was relieved by II Polish Corps and withdrew to Campobasso in Army Group Reserve. The succeeding weeks were spent in training, though 5th (L) Corps Signals lent a wireless detachment to II Polish Corps for the Battle of Ancona in July.

Under its new GOC, Lt-Gen Charles Keightley, V Corps' next task was to act as a pursuit force after Eighth Army's expected breakthrough of the Gothic Line in Operation Olive. By the time the attack began, the corps' role had changed to an attempt to rush the Gothic Line by surprise, even though neither the HQ nor its divisions had carried out an offensive operation for many months. The first phase (25 August–3 September) went well and the German positions were overrun, Corps HQ and Signals moving up to Montegridolfo. But V Corps was checked at the Battle of Gemmano (4–15 September). The signallers following behind the advance had to deal with extensive demolitions and minefields, the three line sections as far forward as possible (reinforced by 21 Line Section to carry out maintenance in the rear) and the Tactical HQ signal office located on the edge of the gun line. By 5 September the main cable was through to Morciano di Romagna, but HQ did not follow until 15 September. The cable artery was across the river Conca by 19 September, at the cost of several casualties. By 20 September, the enemy began to disengage, but the weather slowed the pursuit. On 6 October, signal deception measures were instituted to give the false impression that further advance was impossible, but on the advance continued, with Corps HQ reaching Andrea di Bagnolo on 15 October with Signals HQ in nearby Borghi. Casualties among the signallers had already been heavy, but after the crossing of the Savio the campaign ground on, Corps HQ and Signals moving to Cesena (27 October) and then Bertinoro (11 November). The Marzino was crossed on 24 November and the Lanone the following day, but the rain caused the rivers to rise by several feet and threaten cable links. Faenza was finally taken on 27 December and the front stabilised along the river Senio. Snow brought down all the main signal circuits on 6 January 1945 and V Corps had to rely on wireless for several hours while the line sections worked to restore connections.

During the winter pause, as corps boundaries were adjusted, V Corps HQ and Signals moved to Terra del Sole by 19 January and then in early February to Villa Pasatoni with signals in the former I Canadian Corps' Signal Centre in Ravenna. To run the extensive signal network, 5th (L) Corps Signals was reinforced by 523 Basuto Signal Section. Operation Grapeshot began on 9 April, with Eighth Army pushing through the 'Argenta Gap' into the Po Valley, and V Corps HQ following in a series of short bounds. By 23 April, the corps had closed up to the River Po, with HQ in Montesanto. The corps began crossing the Po the next day. 5th (L) Corps Signals had practised 'long span construction' for stringing signal cable across a wide obstacle, but its first cable across the river utilised a damaged railway bridge. A second, long span, crossing was swept away within 48 hours. By 29 April, Corps HQ and Signals had reached Bosaro. On 2 May, the German forces in Italy surrendered.

The German surrender did not end the rapid advance, as elements of Eighth Army continued on into Austria. V Corps HQ and Signals reached Noventa Padovana on 1 May, Udine on 4 May, and Tricesimo on 7 May. It had outrun its line communications and its wireless was overworked: additional sets were borrowed from Army, Division and Brigade signal units to control traffic at river crossings and along the roads crammed with formations moving north. V Corps entered Austria on 10 May and established its HQ at Pritschitz am Worthersee to begin occupation duties. The Austrian public telephone system could now be utilised and the wireless links closed down. By 16 June, the HQ settled at Portschach am Worthersee, with signals in the Hotel Europa. Its role now was to provide communications for the units coping with the complexities of postwar Austria, with its roving bands of partisans, Prisoners of War to secure, and Displaced persons to deal with. At different points, 5th (L) Corps Signals had a German signal company and a Hungarian unit under command. A rearrangement of occupation duties saw V Corps take over the Styria zone from Soviet forces, and a line section was despatched to establish communications with 46th Division at Graz.

On 6 September, 5 (L) Corps Signals began a move back to Salerno in Italy, to prepare for disbandment. During October, the unit was reduced to 30 per cent of its war establishment and it was officially disbanded on 27 November 1945.

On disbandment, the cadre of 5th (L) Corps Signals consisting of men awaiting demobilisation took in reinforcements and formed 3 Company, 7 Headquarters Signals. This consisted of a despatch rider section, an operating section, two medium wireless sections, a terminal equipment section and a signals park, and began training for service in the Middle East. In February 1946, the remaining 5th (L) Corps men left for demobilisation and the company left Italy for Egypt. (Note: A new 5th Corps Signal Regiment was formed in the Regular Army in 1951, as a result its successor unit (30 Signal Regiment) claims descent from the 1st Middlesex Engineer Volunteers, though there is only a tenuous link to that unit.)

== Postwar ==
When the TA was reconstituted in 1947, the unit was reformed at Fulham House as 23rd (Southern) Corps Signal Regiment, under the command of Lt-Col E.W.G. Knight, who had been the last commanding officer of 18 LoC Signals. In 1955, the unit was renamed as 2nd Corps Signal Regiment (London), changing to 2nd (London) Signal Regiment in 1958.

In 1960, the regiment regained its traditional number as 47 (London) Signal Regiment. However, the following year, it was merged with 40 (Middlesex Yeomanry) Signal Rgt to form 47 (Middlesex Yeomanry) Signal Rgt, later reduced to squadron status in 31 (City of London) Signal Regiment. Its successor unit is today's 31 (Middlesex Yeomanry and Princess Louise's Kensington) Signal Sqn in 71 (Yeomanry) Signal Regiment. In 2010, 83 Support Sqn (the former London District Signals) of 31 Signal Sqn was renamed 47 Signal Troop to perpetuate the unit. The Troop is based in Uxbridge and Southfields.

== Commanders ==
=== Commanding Officers ===
The following served as commanding officer of the unit and its successors:

47th (2nd London) Divisional Signals

- Lt-Col W.F. Bruce, DSO, MC, 1921
- Lt-Col T.W. Vigers, OBE, MC, TD, 1927
- Lt-Col H. Lloyd-Howard, MC, TD, 1932

London Corps Signals

- Lt-Col C.L.H. Humphreys, TD, 1939

1st (London) Corps Signals – later 2nd, 6th and 3rd (L) Corps Signals

- Lt-Col C.L.H. Humphreys, TD
- Lt-Col W.H. Lloyd, MC, 1940
- Lt-Col F.S. Whiteway-Wilkinson, 1943

No 18 Line of Communication Signals

- Lt-Col E.W.G. Knight, TD, 1944

21st Corps Signals

- Maj L. Hurley 1942
- Lt-Col L.R.C. Watson, 1943
- Lt-Col R.C. Yule, OBE, 1943
- Lt-Col L. Hurley, MBE, 1943

Eastern Command Signals (India)

- Lt-Col R.B. Gray, 1943
- Lt-Col M. Stonestreet, 1947

2nd (London) Corps Signals

- Lt-Col C.A. Oliver, MC, Mobilisation to 16 September 1940

5th (London) Corps Signals

- Lt-Col F.A. Manley, 17 September 1940 to 16 January 1941
- Lt-Col H.J.F. White, 17 January 1941 to 4 June 1942
- Lt-Col W.B.G. Collis, MBE, 5 June to 11 October 1942
- Lt-Col R.G. Yolland, 12 October 1942 to 18 March 1944
- Lt-Col D. White, 19 March 1944 to 28 March 1945
- Lt-Col W.A. Tomlinson, 29 March to 8 May 1945
- Lt-Col L.T. Shawcross, OBE, 9 May to 15 October 1945
- Lt-Col J.J. Ballard, OBE, 16 October 1945 to disbandment

23rd (Southern) Corps Signal Regiment

- Lt-Col E.W.G. Knight, TD, 1947
- Lt-Col J.G. Vhristopher, TD, 1950
- Lt-Col R.C. Newcombe, OBE, 1953

2nd (London) Signal Regiment

- Lt-Col R.C. Newcombe, OBE, 1955

=== Honorary Colonels ===
The following served as Honorary Colonel of the unit:

- Col G. Smith, appointed 6 May 1922
- Col J.G. Fleming, CBE, DSO, appointed 15 February 1928
- Colonel T.W. Vigers, OBE, MC, TD, appointed to London Corps Signals 1 January 1936 and acted in the same role for 5th (London) Corps Signals during World War II

== External sources ==
- The Long, Long Trail
- Land Forces of Britain, the Empire and Commonwealth – Regiments.org (archive site)
- Stepping Forward: A Tribute to the Volunteer Military Reservists and Supporting Auxiliaries of Greater London
