= 60 (Royal Buckinghamshire Hussars) Signal Squadron =

Royal Signals Territorial Army based in Aylesbury, England

The Squadron was a Royal Signals Territorial Army unit based in Aylesbury, with detachments at Bedford, Cambridge, and High Wycombe. The role of the Squadron was to provide secure radio communications in support of 2 (National Communications) Signal Brigade, using a Clansman communications equipment. The Squadron provided VHF (Very High Frequency) and HF (High Frequency) communications in order to pass information in support of military units or civilian organisations, through the operation of Radio Rebroadcast (REBRO) and Rear Link Detachments (RLDs).

The unit was formed as an Independent Squadron in July 1999 from E Company, 5th Battalion, The Royal Green Jackets (initially intended to form part of 72 Signal Regiment) and was regimented to 71 (Yeomanry) Signal Regiment in September 2002. Following the TA Rebalancing of 2006, the Squadron transferred to 36 (Eastern) Signal Regiment; its Detachment in High Wycombe (Booker) closed at this time, the members transferring either to Aylesbury, or to 47 Sqn, Uxbridge.

Under the Strategic Review of the Reserves in April, 2009, 60 (Royal Buckinghamshire Hussars) Signal Squadron downsized to 860 (Royal Buckinghamshire Hussars) Signal Troop and became part of the Berkshire Yeomanry, 94 Signal Squadron, under 39 (Skinners) Signal Regiment, at Bristol. The squadron is being re-roled with Bowman communications equipment. Bravo and Charlie Troops at Bedford and Cambridge were disbanded.

Finally 860 Signal Troop at Aylesbury was removed from the Army's order of battle in the SDSR changes at the end of 2013.
