= City of London Signals =

56th (1st London) Divisional Signals (City of London) London Divisional Signals (City of London Signals) 56 Signal Squadron
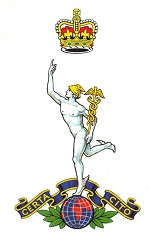
- Badge of the Royal Corps of Signals
- Active: 1920–1967; 1977–2016
- Country: United Kingdom
- Branch: Territorial Army
- Role: Signals
- Part of: 56th (London) Division
- Garrison/HQ: Gray's Inn Road; Clapham Park; Chelsea, London; Eastbourne
- Engagements: North African Campaign; Operation Avalanche; Anzio; Gothic Line; Argenta Gap

The City of London Signals was a Territorial Army unit of the British Army's Royal Corps of Signals. It had its origins in a signal company of the Royal Engineers formed in 1908 and during World War II it provided the divisional signals for the 56th (London) Division and its duplicates as well as communications for the Royal Air Force in the Middle East. Its successors continued in the postwar Territorial Army and Army Reserve until 2016.

== Origin ==
When the Royal Corps of Signals was created in 1920 the 56th (1st London) Divisional Signals (Note: Divisional signal units of the Royal Signals 1920–45 were battalion-sized and commanded by a Lieutenant-Colonel or Major; they were not termed 'regiments' until 1946.) was formed in the Territorial Army (TA). It was reformed from the former 1st London Divisional Signal Company of the Royal Engineers (RE), which had served through World War I.

=== Royal Engineers ===
When the old Volunteer Force was subsumed into the Territorial Force after the Haldane reforms in 1908, the East London (Tower Hamlets) Engineers provided the RE components of the Territorial Force's 1st London Division, including the 1st London Divisional Telegraph Company, RE, with the following organisation:

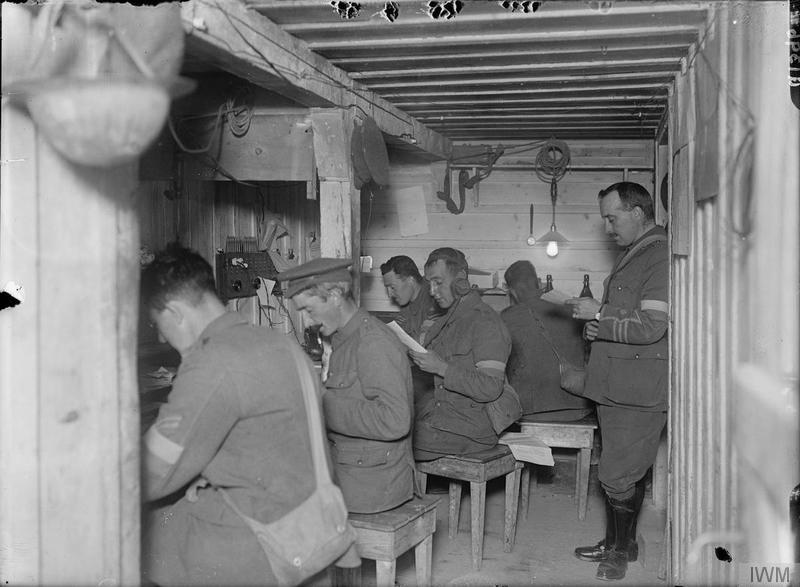
RE Signal Company at work on the Western Front.

- Company Headquarters (HQ) at 10 Victoria Park Square, Bethnal Green
- No 1 Section at 10 Victoria Park Square
- No 2 (1st London) Section
- No 3 (2nd London) Section
- No 4 (3rd London) Section

Nos 2–4 Sections were attached to and largely manned by the three infantry brigades of the division. The Telegraph Company was redesignated a Signal Company in 1911.

The 1st London Division mobilised on the outbreak of World War I in August 1914, and the 1st London Brigade, with No 2 Signal Section, was sent on 4 September to relieve the Regular Army garrison of Malta. The rest of the division's infantry and artillery was progressively sent to France to reinforce the Regulars of the British Expeditionary Force. In February 1915, HQ and No 1 Section of the Signal Company were assigned to 29th Division, newly formed from Regular units brought back from colonial garrisons. On 25 April, the division landed at Cape Helles on the Gallipoli Peninsula, and it served through the Gallipoli Campaign until the final evacuation in January 1916. It was then transferred to the Western Front, where it attacked Beaumont-Hamel on the First day on the Somme and then served through the battles of Arras, Third Ypres and Cambrai in 1917 and the German spring offensive and Allied Hundred Days Offensive in 1918. After the Armistice, the division was sent into Germany as part of the British Army of the Rhine. Following the demobilisation of remaining Territorial Force elements, the signal company was converted into Southern Division Signals in Germany in November 1919. A Regular unit, this continued until the division disbanded in 1923

Shortly after mobilisation in 1914, the Territorial Force raised 2nd Line units with the same titles as the parents, but with a '2/' prefix, including the 2/1st London Divisional Signal Company in the 58th (2/1st London) Division. This incorporated Nos 3 and 4 Sections of the 1st Line company, which had been left in England when their brigades went overseas piecemeal. In January 1916, the 1st London Division began to reform in France as the 56th (1/1st London) Division, and the whole of 2/1st London Signal Company left 58th Division and joined the reformed division on 16 February as 56th (London) Signal Company. (Note: 1/1st London Signal Co was replaced in 58th Division by 2/1st Wessex Signal Co, whose parent 45th (2nd Wessex) Division had gone to garrison India.) The 56th Division attacked the Gommecourt Salient on the first day on the Somme, and then served through Arras, Ypres, Cambrai and the battles of 1918. After the Armistice Divisional HQ was demobilised in May 1919.

=== Royal Corps of Signals ===
The new 56th (1st London) Divisional Signals was formed in 1920 as part of the new Royal Corps of Signals in the reorganised Territorial Army, based at 3 Henry Street, Gray's Inn Road, later moving a short distance to 51 Calthorpe Street. By the 1930s, 56th (1st London) Signals HQ also administered two units of the Supplementary Reserve (SR) at Calthorpe St:

- No 1 (City of London) Company, Line of Communication Signals
- No 1 (City of London) Base Signal Company, Line of Communication Signals

In the 1930s, the unit was awarded the supplementary title City of London Signals, but moved its HQ from central London to Signal House, 20 Atkins Road, Clapham Park, accompanied by the SR units, which had expanded into:

- HQ Line of Communication Signals
- No 1 Company, Line of Communication Signals
- No 4 (City of London) Company, Line of Communication Signals
- No 21 (City of London) Cable Section
- No 21 (City of London) Construction Section
- No 22 (City of London) Construction Section
- No 3 (City of London) Air Wing Signal Section

Haberdashers' Aske's Hampstead School Cadet Corps (as 1st Cadet Signal Company) and the City of London Signals Cadet Company were affiliated to the unit. The unit's motorcycle despatch riders formed a display team that performed at the Royal Tournament in 1937, precursors of the Royal Signals Motorcycle Display Team (the White Helmets).

In 1935, 47th (2nd London) Division was converted into 1st Anti-Aircraft Division and its remaining units were merged into 56th (1st London) Division, which was redesignated simply The London Division, and the signals unit as London Divisional Signals (City of London Signals). The London Division was converted into a Motor Division in 1937.

== World War II ==
=== Mobilisation ===
When the Territorial Army was doubled in size after the Munich Crisis, the division was duplicated and 1st and 2nd (London) Motor Divisional Signals were formed at Clapham in 1939. Later in the same year, the 1st London also formed the London Area Signal Company, which in 1940 became London District Signals (Note: Not to be confused with the pre-World War I London District Signals, which in World War II provided communications for anti-aircraft formations in the London area.) providing headquarters communications.

==== Organisation ====
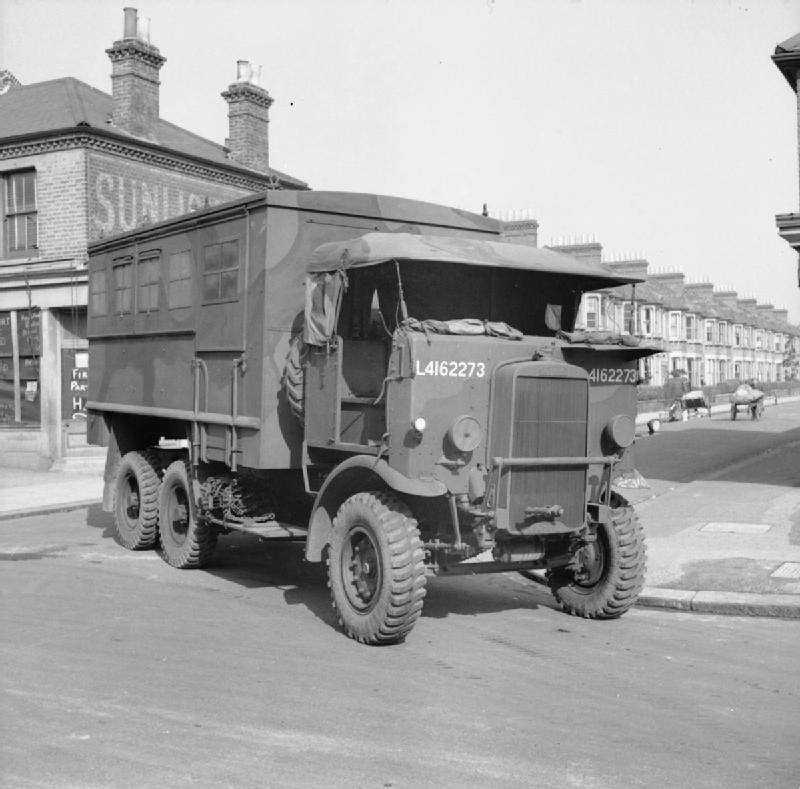
Leyland Retriever wireless lorry, 1941.

In 1939, the organisation of an infantry divisional signal unit and the attachments of its subunits were as follows:

- HQ
  - Q Section – quartermasters
  - M Section – maintenance
- 1 Company – Divisional HQ
  - A & C Sections – wireless
  - B Section – cable
  - D Section – despatch riders and cipher section
  - O Section – operating
- 2 Company – divisional artillery
  - E, F & G Sections – individual artillery regiments
  - H Section – HQ divisional artillery
- 3 Company – infantry brigades, reconnaissance and RE
  - R Section – reconnaissance battalion
  - J, K & L Sections – individual infantry brigades
- 4 Company – attached army tank brigade
  - W Section – army tank brigade
  - X, Y & Z Sections – individual tank regiments

As the war progressed, divisional signals was enlarged to cover the divisional radio telephony (R/T) and wireless telephony (W/T) nets, divisional administrative services, rear communications for brigade HQs, divisional tactical HQ, and air communications.

=== 56th (London) Divisional Signals ===
56th (London) Division's formation sign of Dick Whittington's cat, leading to its nickname of the 'Black Cats'.

1st London Division (it dropped the 'Motor' designation in June 1940) was not sent to join the new British Expeditionary Force in France but remained in the UK. After the Dunkirk evacuation the division held the critical south-east corner of England throughout the period of greatest invasion threat. It regained its traditional title as 56th (London) Infantry Division on 18 November 1940.

From November 1940, 56th (L) Division alternated with 43rd (Wessex) Infantry Division, being based at Maidstone and the Medway towns until February 1941 and then again from June. In November 1941, the division drove through London to join XI Corps in East Anglia. The division was now fully equipped and undergoing intensive training and in June it came under War Office control while it mobilised for overseas service.

==== Middle East and North Africa ====
During August 1942, the division moved to the embarkation ports of Liverpool and Glasgow, and sailed for the Middle East on 25 August. The fast troop convoy reached South Africa safely, but the slow convoy carrying guns and vehicles was heavily attacked by U-boats off the coast of West Africa and lost several ships. From South Africa most of the troops sailed to Bombay, then on to Basra in Iraq, arriving on 4 November and then by road and rail to Kirkuk. 56th Division spent the winter of 1942–43 training for mountain warfare. In March, 168th (2nd London) Brigade with accompanying units was detached to Palestine. Then the rest of the division began an overland drive to join Eighth Army in Tunisia, driving some 3,200 miles (5,100 km) between 18 March and 19 April.

On 23 April, 56th (London) Division went into action for the first time at Enfidaville. The infantry were roughly handled and suffered heavy casualties. The final attack on Tunis (Operation Strike) began on 6 May, the division meeting strong resistance before the Germans surrendered on 12 May. By the end of the month, 56th (L) Division had been pulled back to Tripoli to train for the invasion of Italy.

==== Operation Avalanche ====
56th (London) Division landed as the right hand half of X Corps at Salerno before dawn on 9 September 1943 in Operation Avalanche. There was bitter fighting for 10 days in the Salerno beachhead and support troops frequently found themselves in the firing line holding off German counter-attacks.

On 22 September, the Allies broke out and X Corps headed north towards Naples. The retreating Germans had blown every bridge across the River Sarno for 8 miles (13 km) inland, but 56th Division captured an intact bridge at San Mauro and continued past Naples to Capua, where the Germans were making a stand on the River Volturno. Assault crossings of rivers now became a feature of the campaign, and the signal units had to make special arrangements at assembly points, ensure waterproofing of equipment, and provide beachhead communications on the far side. Divisional HQs normally operated as Main and Rear echelons, sometimes with a small Tactical HQ. During phases of mobile warfare a Main HQ could move every day, and wireless and despatch riders had to be used until lines could be re-established.

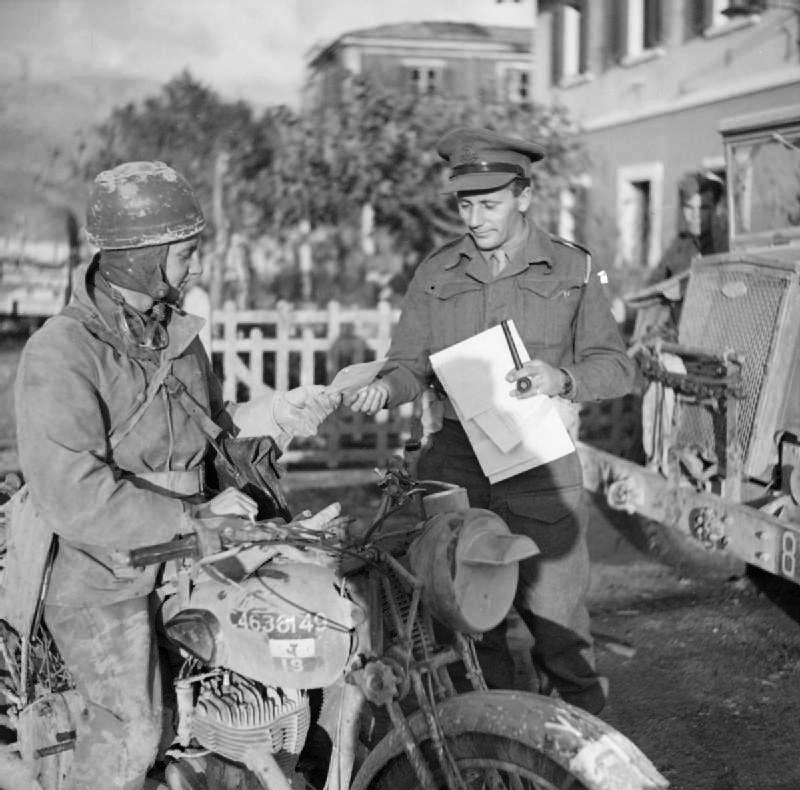
A Royal Signals motorcycle despatch rider in Italy, 1943.

The division's attempt to cross the Volturno was repulsed, but the neighbouring divisions got across, and 56th (L) crossed by a US-built bridge. 168 Bde Group rejoined 56th (L) Division at Caserta during these operations. After the Volturno, X Corps made rapid progress up Highway 6 until it reached the Bernhardt Line in the mountains round Monte Camino. There was bitter fighting on Monte Camino itself that lasted until its capture on 9 December, when the division was rested. The next obstacle in front of X Corps was the lower Garigliano river south of Monte Cassino. 56th (London) Division's attack on the night of 17 January launched the Battle of Monte Cassino. However, fierce counter-attacks prevented X Corps from advancing far beyond the river.

==== Anzio ====
On 30 January, 168 Bde was about to resume the offensive on the Garigliano when it was hurriedly withdrawn to reinforce the landing further up the coast at Anzio, which had run into trouble. On 6 February, the rest of 56th Division was also withdrawn from the Garigliano and landed as reinforcements at Anzio. The infantry were continually engaged in the Anzio beachhead and, by 25 February, were down to less than half strength. On 9 March, the exhausted division was evacuated from Anzio.

56th Division now went back to Egypt for rest. On arrival at Port Said, it went into camp, leave was granted, and training resumed. On 10 July, the refitted division left Port Said to return to Taranto, from where it was sent to join V Corps with Eighth Army on the Adriatic coast of Italy.

==== Gothic Line ====
Massive preparations were required for Eighth Army's assault on the Gothic Line (Operation Olive). V Corps opened the attack on 25 August and, by 1 September, the Gothic Line had been cracked open, but 56th (L) Division coming up from reserve still had hard fighting at Monte Capello, Montefiore Conca village and the Gemmano ridge. It finally took Gemmano village on 9 September. After a short rest, the division advanced on 16 September and fought its way to the swollen Fiumicino river by the beginning of October. On 7 October, the exhausted division was withdrawn.

==== Argenta Gap ====
In the middle of December, the division returned to the line, moving via Forlì to Faenza, where it spent the winter months. For 56th (L) Division the Spring 1945 offensive in Italy began on 5 April with an operation to clear a triangle of ground between the River Reno and the south-west corner of Comacchio Lagoon. On the night of 10/11 April, 56th Division launched Operation Impact Plain to widen the bridgehead and open the 'Argenta Gap' and on 16 April it took Bastia in Operation Impact Royal.

On 25 April, the division reached the River Po. This was a formidable obstacle, and 56th (L) Division planned to make an assault crossing that night. In the event the infantry got across by storm boat in the afternoon to occupy Crespino, and the river assault after nightfall was almost unopposed. The division pushed on to the Adige, where it crossed near Rovigo. 56th (London) Division and 2nd New Zealand Division were given the task of capturing Venice, which they did on 28 April after a brief action. The war in Italy ended on 2 May with the Surrender of Caserta.

=== 3rd Air Formation Signals ===
2nd (London) Motor Divisional Signals was detached from its division at the end of 1939 and reorganised as 3rd Army Signals. After Dunkirk, it was redesignated No 2 Headquarters Signals, then again in October 1940 as 3rd Air Formation Signals. Since 1938 the Royal Corps of Signals had provided land communications for Royal Air Force (RAF) HQs overseas through Air Formation Signals (AFS) units. 3rd Air Formation Signals HQ was sent to Middle East Forces at the end of 1940, to be built up to strength by absorbing small units already serving with No 204 Group and other RAF HQs. It left a large cadre in England to reform 47th Divisional Signals (see below).

With the proliferation of RAF HQs in the Middle East, 4th Air Formation Signals was formed in July from Nos 2 and 3 Companies of 3rd AFS. Of these, No 2 had been raised in October 1940 and was operating in Cyrenaica, while No 3 had recently returned from the Greek Campaign. 4th AFS was later absorbed into the North Somerset Yeomanry.

No 204 Group was expanded into the Western Desert Air Force in October 1941. This had to be mobile to cooperate with Eighth Army's forthcoming offensive (Operation Crusader): the two fighter wing HQs could leapfrog forwards, and they were split into several flying wings, each with its own landing ground (LG). Three LGs linked by land-line to their parent wing HQ formed a 'fighter airfields area'. As the army and air force advanced, new LGs could be rapidly established, the earlier LGs being taken over by bomber squadrons. All this imposed a heavy burden on the AFS units maintaining communications as the Western Desert Campaign ebbed and flowed in advance and retreat. In 1942, 4th (NSY) AFS was allocated to the Desert Air Force, leaving 3rd AFS to concentrate on 'area' tasks for other RAF HQs in Egypt and the Middle East.

In 1943, a standardisation committee regularised the various HQ signal units, and AFS units were supposed to adopt the following organisation:

- 2 Line Troops
- 2 Construction Troops
- 2 Terminal Equipment Troops
- 3 Telegraph Operating Troops
- 2 Despatch Rider Troops (in the Western Desert light trucks frequently replaced DR motorcycles)
- 1 Technical Maintenance Troop
- 5 Wing Troops

After the Second Battle of Alamein, followed by Eighth Army's advance into Tunisia and subsequently to Italy, 3rd AFS continued to serve in the Middle East. It was disbanded in September 1945.

=== 47th (London) Divisional Signals ===
47th (London) Division's formation sign, referencing Bow Bells.

2nd (London) Motor Division dropped the 'Motor' part of its title in June 1940 and was renamed 47th (London) Division on 21 November. 47th (London) Divisional Signals (Note: Not to be confused with 47th (2nd London) Divisional Signals, 1920–35.) was reformed from the cadre left behind when 3rd Air Formation Signals went to the Middle East. The division was in reserve behind the anti-invasion formations along the South Coast of England, with winter quarters in Hampshire and Sussex.

In December 1941, the division was placed on a lower establishment, though still with an operational role in Home Forces. In January 1944, it moved from Hampshire and Dorset District to Northern Command, returning to Southern Command between March and July. After D Day (6 June), reserve units and formations in the UK were required to send large drafts to reinforce 21st Army Group fighting in Normandy. On 15 August 1944, what remained of 47th (L) Division began to disperse: divisional signals was disbanded on 18 August. (Note: A new 47th (Reserve) Division was formed on 1 September 1944, simply by redesignating the existing 76th Division with its own signals and support units.)

== Postwar ==
56th (London) Armoured Divisional sign 1948–51.

When the Territorial Army was reconstituted in 1947, 56th (London) Division became an armoured division, with the requisite signal regiment (as Royal Corps of Signals units were now termed) provided by the City of London Signals. 56th (London) Armoured Divisional Signal Regiment (City of London Signals) was based along with the divisional HQ in Chelsea, London. In 1956, the division was reconverted into an infantry division, with consequent reorganisation and redesignation of the signal regiment.

During this period, a divisional signal regiment was organised as follows:

56th (London) Armoured Divisional sign 1951–61: Dick Whittington's cat with St Paul's sword.

- Regimental HQ
- Light Aid Detachment, Royal Electrical and Mechanical Engineers
- Communications Section Troop
- HQ Squadron
  - Squadron HQ
  - Q Troop (quartermasters)
  - S Troop (stores)
  - M Troop (technical maintenance)
- 1 Squadron
  - SHQ
  - C Troop (lines)
  - O Troop (signal centre)
  - R Troop (radio relay)
- 2 Squadron
  - SHQ
  - A Troop (radio) (Divisional Main HQ)
  - B Troop (radio) (Divisional Rear HQ)

In addition, each brigade within the division had its own dedicated signal squadron providing Troops to the armoured and artillery regiments and rear link detachments to infantry battalions.

In 1961, the division was disbanded and 56th (London) Signal Regiment was reduced to 332 Signal Squadron (from 167 Infantry Brigade Signals at Balham). The squadron was assigned to 54 (East Anglian) Signal Regiment, but was disbanded when the Territorial Army was reduced into the Territorial and Army Volunteer Reserve in 1967.

In 1947, London District Signals was reduced to a mixed squadron ('mixed' indicating that members of the Women's Royal Army Corps were integrated into the unit) and in 1949 to a troop, but in 1952 it was reformed as London District Signal Regiment in the Army Emergency Reserve (the successors of the Supplementary Reserve). In 1959, it was redesignated 87 Signal Regiment (District) and in 1961 was merged into 80 Signal Regiment. This regiment, which had the Communications Zone role, was itself disbanded in 1967.

In 1977, the City of London Signals' traditional number was revived when two troops of 44 (Cinque Ports) Signal Squadron, 858 (Corps) Signal Troop at Eastbourne and 859 Signal Troop from Ilford (which then moved to Sandgate, near Folkestone) were combined to form 56 Signal Squadron under 36 (Eastern) Signal Regiment. Both troops had the role of reinforcing the Regular 22 Signal Regiment at Lippstadt in Germany as part of British Army of the Rhine. In 1982, this role was expanded to reinforcing 2 Infantry Division HQ and Signal Regiment; later it was re-roled as a theatre reserve squadron for British Army of the Rhine Command Communications. In 1990, 56 Signal Squadron became independent and then in 1992 it reorganised as a National Communications Squadron and concentrated at Eastbourne. The squadron lost its independent status when it was regimented with 31 (City of London) Signal Regiment in November 1995. By 2013, it was part of 39 (Skinners) Signal Regiment but it disbanded by April 2016 under the Army 2020 plans; the Eastbourne Army Reserve centre taken was over by 3rd Battalion Princess of Wales's Royal Regiment with the signals personnel given the option to re-role as infantry.

== Commanders ==
=== Commanding Officers ===
The following served as commanding officer of the unit and its successors:

56th (1st London) Divisional Signals (City of London), and 1st (London) Motor Divisional Signals

- Maj (later Lt-Col) H. Lloyd-Howard, MC, 1921
- Lt-Col H.F. Fox, TD, 1926
- Lt-Col G.D. Ozanne, MC, 1931
- Lt-Col A.C.C. Willway, 1936
- Lt-Col T.S.A. Campbell, 1941
- Lt-Col C.C. Danby, OBE, 1942
- Lt-Col F.R.B. Moore, 1944
- Lt-Col L.T. Shawcross, OBE
- Lt-Col W.A. Tomlinson

2nd (London) Motor Divisional Signals

- Lt-Col F. White, 1939
- Lt-Col J.H. Cameron-Webb, 1939

3rd Air Formation Signals

- Lt-Col J.H. Cameron-Webb, 1940
- Lt-Col J.R. Sutcliffe, OBE, 1041
- Lt-Col E.B. Tinney, 1943–45

47th Divisional Signals

- Maj Jean Joseph Duvivier, 1939
- Lt-Col G.S.O'N. Power, 1940
- Lt-Col F.W.S. Jourdain, 1940
- Lt-Col R.W.C. Reeves, 1942
- Lt-Col H.C.B. Rogers, OBE, 1943
- Lt-Col J.R.S. Orchard, TD, 1943
- Lt-Col A. Hill, OBE, 1944

London District Signals

- Maj (later Lt-Col) B. Houghton Brown, 1939
- Lt-Col W.J. Pearce, 1943
- Lt-Col H.V. von S. Thorne, OBE, 1943
- Lt-Col W.E. Pain, MC, 1944

56th (London) Armoured Divisional Signal Regiment (City of London Signals), TA

- Lt-Col N.C. Pearson, OBE, TD, 1947
- Lt-Col T.E. Dobson, 1948
- Lt-Col F.R. Hue Williams, OBE, TD, 1951
- Lt-Col K.C. Goldie-Morrison, TD, 1956

London District Signal Regiment, AER

- Lt-Col G.H.T. Shrimpton, TD, 1952

=== Honorary Colonels ===
The following officers served as Honorary Colonel of the unit:

- Col Jacob Waley-Cohen, CMG, CBE, DSO, TD, appointed 30 June 1928; later Hon Col HQ LoC Signals (SR), appointed 17 October.
- Lt John Denison-Pender, director of Cable & Wireless, appointed 6 December 1933, created Lord Pender 1937.
- Brig A.C.C. Willway, CB, CBE, TD, former CO, 1945–56
