= 1st Cinque Ports Artillery Volunteers =

1st Cinque Ports Artillery Volunteers 3rd Home Counties (Cinque Ports) Brigade 59th (Home Counties) (Cinque Ports) Field Brigade 75th Heavy AA Regiment
- Active: 7 November 1859–1 March 1955
- Country: United Kingdom
- Branch: Volunteer Force/Territorial Army
- Type: Artillery Corps
- Role: Coastal Artillery; Field Artillery; Anti-Aircraft Artillery
- Size: Artillery Brigade/Regiment
- Garrison/HQ: Dover
- Mottos: Pro aris et focis (For hearth and home)
- Engagements: World War I: Ramadi; Khan Baghdadi; Sharqar; World War II: The Blitz; Iraq

Commanders
- Notable commanders: Lt-Col J.M. Stebbings, EM, MC; Lt-Col N.V. Sadler, DCM

The 1st Cinque Ports Artillery Volunteers was a part-time unit of the British Army's Royal Artillery from 1860 to 1956. Raised as coastal defence artillery, the unit later served as field artillery in Mesopotamia during World War I, and as anti-aircraft artillery during the Blitz and in the Middle East during World War II.

== Volunteer Force ==
The enthusiasm for the Volunteer Movement following an invasion scare in 1859 saw the creation of many units composed of part-time soldiers eager to supplement the Regular British Army in time of need. A large number of coastal artillery corps (AVCs) were formed in the seaports along the Kent and Sussex coast (the ancient Cinque Ports). On 10 September 1862, these were brought together to form the 1st Administrative Brigade, Cinque Ports Artillery Volunteers, at Dover:

1st Administrative Brigade, Cinque Ports Artillery Volunteers

- 1st A Cinque Ports AVC – raised at Dover as 1st Cinque Ports AVC 6 January 1860; increased to two batteries on 21 April 1860; renumbered as 3rd in May 1860; redesignated 1st A in August 1860
- 1st B Cinque Ports AVC – raised at Folkestone as 3rd Kent AVC 7 November 1859; transferred from 1st Kent Artillery Volunteers in April 1860 renumbered as 1st in May 1860; redesignated 1st B in August 1860
- 1st C Cinque Ports AVC – raised at Ramsgate as 2nd on 2 January 1860, increased to two batteries; redesignated 1st C in August 1860
- 2nd Cinque Ports AVC – raised at Sandwich as 2nd on 13 February 1860; designated 4th from May to August 1860
- 3rd Cinque Ports AVC – raised at Walmer as 3rd on 6 February 1860; designated 5th from May to August 1860
- 4th Cinque Ports AVC – raised at Hastings on 23 February 1860; designated 6th from May to August 1860; four batteries by 1861, later reduced to three
- 5th Cinque Ports AVC – raised at Hythe on 17 December 1859 as 1st Section, raised to a Sub-Division and then a Battery; designated 7th in May 1860; redesignated 5th in August 1860; disbanded 1867
- 5th Cinque Ports AVC – new corps raised at St Leonards-on-Sea 2 October 1867
- 6th Cinque Ports AVC – raised at Margate 26 June 1861 as a Sub-Division; raised to Battery 13 May 1865; renumbered 8th in October 1870
- 7th Cinque Ports AVC – raised at Pevensey 9 April 1866, renumbered 9th in October 1870; second battery raised at Ninfield in 1874

The fourth battery of the 4th (Hastings) Corps was raised in 1861 at Rye, East Sussex from the defunct Rye Rifle Volunteer Corps. This battery wore an unusual naval uniform until it adopted the regulation garrison artillery uniform in 1872. The battery was disbanded in 1876 after a shooting competition at Hastings, when the men refused their captain's orders to march back to Rye and instead caught the train. The 4th (Hastings) Corps also had a Cadet Corps affiliated to it from March 1864 to 1868. The commanding officer (CO) of the 1st Admin Bde from 1862 was Lt-Col Edward Vernon Harcourt, formerly of the Oxfordshire Militia and a leading member of the Volunteer movement and the National Artillery Association.

In 1866, the unit won the Queen's Prize at the annual National Artillery Association competition held at Shoeburyness. In 1870, the corps in the 1st Admin Brigade were numbered consecutively as 1st to 9th Cinque Ports AVCs (in most cases reverting to the numbering of May–August 1860). On 16 March 1880, the Admin Brigade was consolidated as the 1st Cinque Ports Artillery Volunteers, organised as follows:

1st Cinque Ports Artillery Volunteers

- HQ at Dover
- Nos 1 and 2 Batteries at Dover – from former 1st Corps
- No 3 Battery at Folkestone – from former 2nd Corps
- Nos 4 and 5 Batteries at Ramsgate – from former 3rd Corps
- No 6 Battery at Sandwich – from former 4th Corps
- No 7 Battery at Deal – from former 5th Corps
- Nos 8, 9 and 10 Batteries at Hastings – from former 6th Corps
- No 11 Battery at St Leonards – from former 7th Corps
- No 12 Battery and a half battery at Margate – from former 8th Corps
- No 13 Battery at Ninfield – from former 9th Corps
- No 14 Battery at Pevensey – from former 9th Corps

The unit was later reduced to 13 batteries. In April 1882, all artillery volunteers were attached to one of the territorial garrison divisions of the Royal Artillery (RA), and the unit was assigned to the Cinque Ports Division. It was briefly (May 1887 to July 1889) designated the 4th Volunteer (Cinque Ports) Brigade, but reverted to its previous title when the Cinque Ports Division was disbanded and the unit joined the Eastern Division in 1889. On 1 April 1890, the Sussex batteries were separated to form the 2nd Cinque Ports Artillery Volunteers, leaving the 1st with the Kent batteries.

As well as manning fixed coast defence artillery, some of the early Artillery Volunteers manned semi-mobile 'position batteries' of smooth-bore field guns pulled by agricultural horses. But the War Office refused to pay for the upkeep of field guns for Volunteers and they had largely died out in the 1870s. In 1888, the 'position artillery' concept was revived and some Volunteer companies were reorganised as position batteries to work alongside the Volunteer infantry brigades. On 14 July 1892, the 1st Cinque Ports AVs were reorganised as 1 position battery and 7 garrison companies:

1st Cinque Ports Artillery Volunteers

- No 1 Battery at Ramsgate
- Nos 2 and 3 Companies at Dover
- No 4 Company at Folkestone
- Nos 5 and 8 Companies at Sandwich
- No 6 Company at Deal
- No 7 Company at Margate

The artillery volunteers were assigned to the Royal Garrison Artillery (RGA) in 1889, and when the divisional organisation was abolished the unit was designated the 1st Cinque Ports RGA (Volunteers) from 1 January 1902, with a ninth company.

== Territorial Force ==
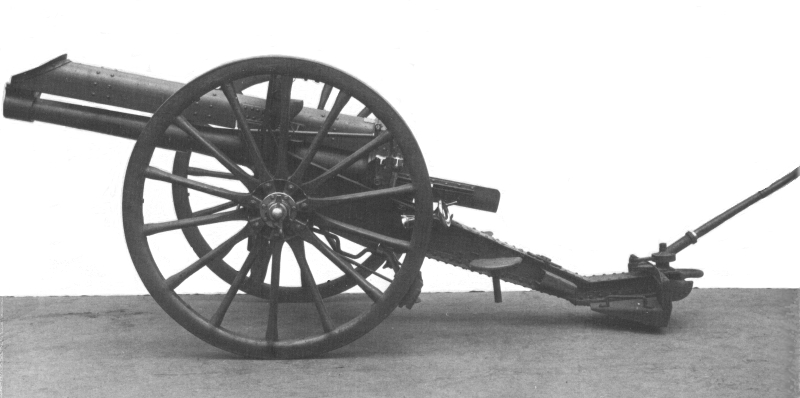
15-pounder gun.

When the Volunteers were subsumed into the new Territorial Force (TF) under the Haldane Reforms of 1908, the 1st Cinque Ports RGA was transferred to the Royal Field Artillery (RFA), initially as I (or 1st) Home Counties Brigade, then from 1910 as the III (or 3rd) Home Counties (Cinque Ports) Brigade with the following organisation:

III Home Counties (Cinque Ports) Brigade, Royal Field Artillery

- HQ at Dover
- 1st Kent Battery at Drill Hall, Liverpool Street, Dover
- 2nd Kent Battery at Drill Hall, Shellon Street, Folkestone
- 3rd Kent Battery, Right Section at Margate, Left Section at Drill Hall, High Street, Ramsgate
- 3rd Home Counties (Cinque Ports) Ammunition Column at Dover, later at Drill Hall, Deal, small arms ammunition section at The Quay, Sandwich

The three batteries were each equipped with four 15-pounder guns. The unit was assigned to the Home Counties Division of the TF.

== World War I ==
=== Mobilisation ===
On the outbreak of war, units of the Territorial Force were mobilised for home defence and then invited to volunteer for Overseas Service. On 15 August 1914, the War Office issued instructions to separate those men who had signed up for Home Service only, and form these into reserve units. On 31 August, the formation of a reserve or 2nd Line unit was authorised for each 1st Line unit where 60 per cent or more of the men had volunteered for Overseas Service. Duplicate battalions, brigades and divisions were created, mirroring those TF formations being sent overseas. The titles of these 2nd Line units would be the same as the original, but distinguished by a '2/' prefix. In this way the 1/III and 2/III Home Counties (Cinque Ports) Brigades were formed.

=== 1/III Home Counties (Cinque Ports) Brigade ===
==== India ====
The bulk of the Home Counties Division, including the 1/III Home Counties Brigade without its Brigade Ammunition Column, embarked at Southampton and sailed on 30 October 1914 to India to relieve Regular Army units to fight on the Western Front. The Territorials disembarked at Bombay 1–3 December, and were allotted to various peacetime stations across India (although the Home Counties Division remained in the order of battle and received a number as the 44th (Home Counties) Division in May 1915, it never served as a complete formation in the war). The 1/III Home Counties Bde went to Jubbulpore where it joined the 5th (Mhow) Division.

==== Mesopotamia ====
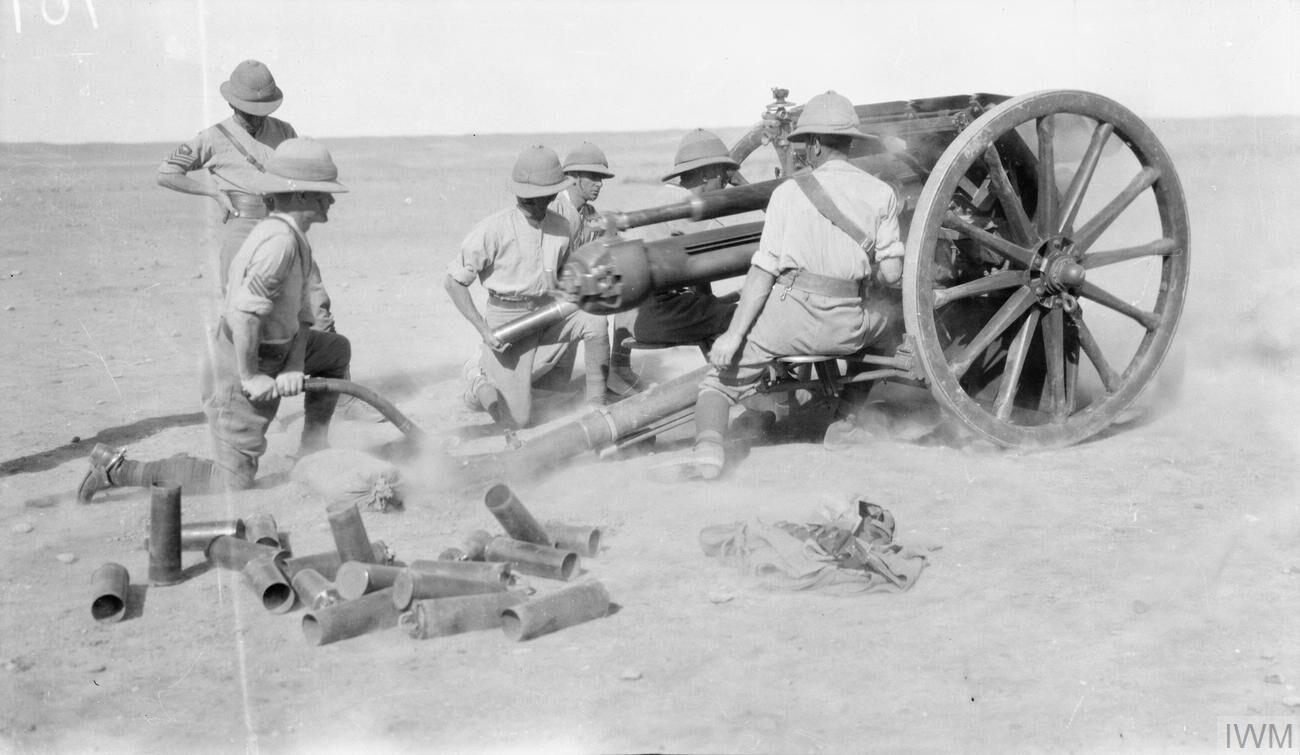
18-pounder in action in Mesopotamia.

The Territorials completed their training in India to prepare them for possible active service, and supplied drafts to units serving in the Mesopotamian campaign. The 2nd Kent Bty moved to Lucknow in June 1915. In 1916, the Home Counties artillery was finally re-equipped with the modern 18-pounder gun. The 1/III Home Counties Bde then left Jubbulpore and sailed to Basra, where it landed on 21 May to reinforce the forces fighting in Mesopotamia. The 2nd Kent Bty from Lucknow joined the newly formed 15th Indian Division on the Euphrates front in July and, on 11 September, the division took part in the action of As Sahilan. In October, the whole brigade was assigned to the 15th Indian Division. Shortly afterwards the brigade was renumbered as CCXXII Brigade (222nd Bde) and the batteries became A, B and C.

In September 1917, the brigade's batteries received numbers as 1070, 1071 and 1072, then rearranged to form two 6-gun batteries, numbered 1070 and 1072. The brigade was joined by 375 and 77 (Howitzer) Btys to bring it up to the new establishment of three 18-pounder batteries and one of 4.5-inch howitzers. 375 Battery was a new six-gun battery formed in 64th (2nd Highland) Division's billeting area round Norwich in December 1916 and then shipped to Mesopotamia. 77 (H) Battery was a regular RFA unit that had been stationed at Meerut in India as part of VI (H) Bde RFA at the outbreak of war and then served in the 5th (Mhow) Division. It was replaced by 429 (H) Bty in October 1918. The brigade then had the following organisation for the remainder of the war:

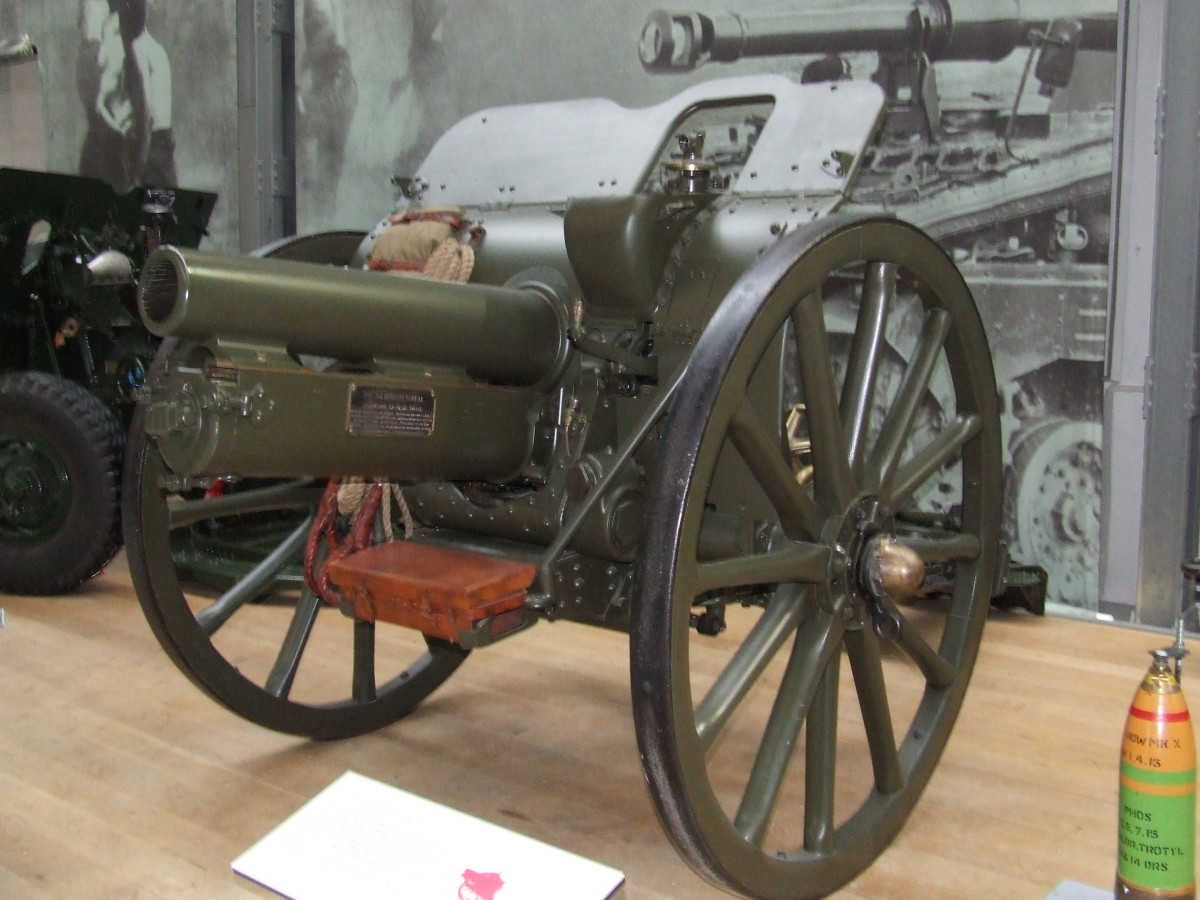
4.5-inch howitzer at the Royal Artillery Museum.

CCXXII Brigade, RFA

- 77 (H) Battery (4 x 4.5-inch howitzers) – until October 1918
- 375 Battery (6 x 18-pounders)
- 429 (H) Battery (4 x 4.5-inch howitzers) – from October 1918
- 1070 Battery (6 x 18-pounders)
- 1072 Battery (6 x 18-pounders)

==== Ramadi ====
In September 1917, 15th Indian Division, which had been in reserve round Baghdad, was ordered to capture Ramadi. 222nd Brigade started from Fallujah and joined the concentration at Madhij on 26 September. The plan was to feint along the Euphrates towards Horseshoe Lake, and then attack Mushaid Ridge. The guns were in position by 00.30 on 28 September, and opened fire at 05.30. The infantry quickly seized the ridge. Next the division moved on Ramadi and on Aziziya Ridge. 90th Punjabis and 2/39th Garhwal Rifles of 12th Indian Brigade, supported by rapid fire from 222nd Bde, captured Aziziya Ridge, cutting off the Turks in Ramadi, who surrendered the following day.

==== Khan Baghdadi ====
There was then a pause in the campaign as reinforcements had to be sent from Mesoptoamia to other fronts, but 15th Division resumed its advance in March 1918, seizing Hīt (9 March) and pressing on towards Khan Baghdadi. The Turks had three trench systems (known as P, Q and R) around Baghdadi, and the leading troops (50th Indian Brigade) began their advance towards them at 21.00 on 25 March. 42nd Indian Brigade, supported by two batteries of 222nd Bde and a siege battery, set off at midnight. A mobile column, consisting of 2/39th Garwhalis, 1072 Bty, and a light armoured motor battery, stood ready to exploit any success. At 03.15 on 26 March, 50th and 42nd Bdes began a two-pronged attack on the strongly-held P trenches, with the supporting artillery concentrated on them. As the infantry closed, the Turks began to retreat and the divisional commander ordered a general advance. The P trenches were captured by 11.30 and at 13.05 the mobile column was ordered forward. Now, 222nd Bde advanced by alternate batteries across rough ground under enemy artillery fire.

The second phase of the attack began at 17.30 with 15 minutes of slow bombardment followed by 15 minutes of intense fire. The guns had worked their way forwards to between 1,800 and 2,200 yards (1,650–2,000 metres) of the enemy positions and spotter aircraft were active, so the fire was very accurate. The infantry got into the R trenches with few casualties. The artillery kept up continuous fire during the night while the cavalry worked their way round behind the Turks and the mobile column raced for Haditha. At 06.30 on 27 March, a general pursuit was ordered: 'The gallant 1072nd Battery, RFA, of the Mobile Column, now double-horsed, strained forward keeping up with the Hertfordshire Yeomanry and 10th Lancers in true horse artillery style'. By last light, the cavalry had reached Ana, and 1072 Bty had kept up with them. Thousands of prisoners were taken, and the Royal Artillery's historian describes the action as 'a magnificent feat, a true cavalry action, excellent cooperation between cavalry, artillery and infantry and fine leadership'.

After the end of the war, the 15th Indian Division was quickly run down as its men returned home, and was formally disbanded in March 1919.

=== 2/III Home Counties (Cinque Ports) Brigade ===
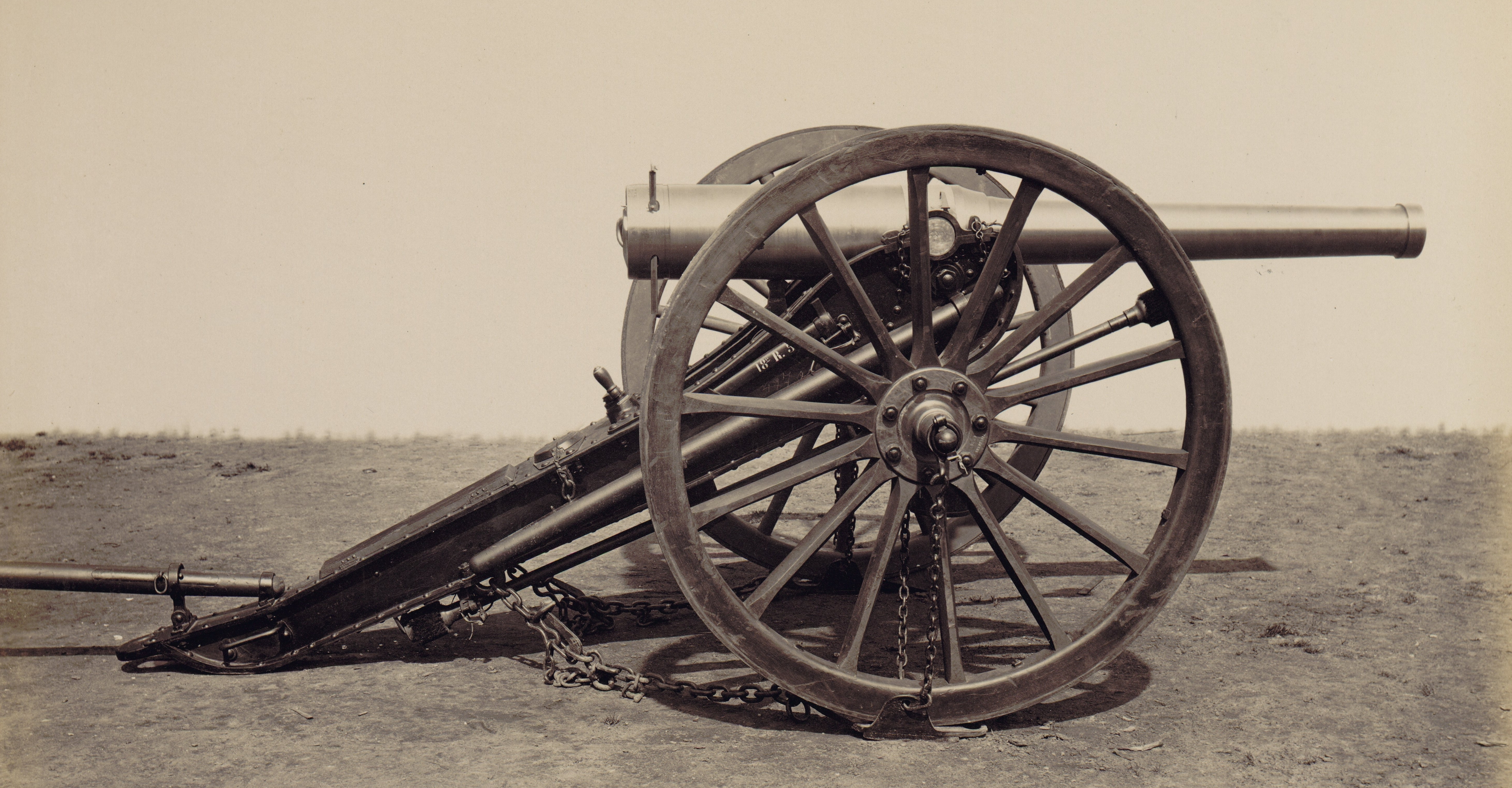
De Bange 90 mm French field gun issued to 2nd Line batteries.

Because the 1st Home Counties Division had gone to India, the 2nd Home Counties Division was among the earliest 2nd Line formations to be formed. By 27 November 1914, the division was settled in billets round Windsor, Berkshire and was reported ready to receive its weapons. However, the only guns available for the RFA brigades were obsolete French 90 mm guns, and even then there were only four per brigade. It was not until January 1916 that the division's gunners received their modern 18-pounders, and even then some time elapsed before sights were received.

Meanwhile, the division had been numbered as 67th (2nd Home Counties) Division and given a dual role of training drafts for units serving overseas and at the same time being part of the mobile force responsible for home defence. From November 1915, it formed part of Second Army, Central Force, quartered in Kent. Twice the division was warned to prepare for moves to Ireland and, in April 1917, to deploy to France, but these moves never happened and the division remained in England for the whole war.

In May 1916, the field brigades were numbered, with 2/III Home Counties becoming CCCXXXVII Brigade (337 Bde) and the batteries were designated A, B and C. In 1917, the batteries were brought up to a strength of six guns and a howitzer battery added when CCCXXXV (formerly 2/I Home Counties) Bde was broken up; D (H) Bty had originally been part of CCCXXXVIII (2/IV Home Counties) Bde.

==== Tigris ====
The brigade left 67th Division on 9 November 1917 and went to Mesopotamia, where it joined the newly formed 18th Indian Division at Baghdad by February 1918. 337th Brigade was completed by the addition of 341 (Howitzer) Bty and was under the command of Lt-Col M.C.J. Hartland–Mahon. At the beginning of March 1918, the division began moving up the Tigris to join I Indian Corps, and 337th Bde went to Samarra with 55th Indian Brigade. The force made a demonstration beyond Samarra, but then returned to the town, which became the divisional HQ through the hot summer months.

By October 1918, the Turks were in retreat in Palestine and on the Euphrates Front in Mesopotamia, and it was time for the forces on the parallel Tigris Front to exert pressure by advancing on Mosul. 18th Indian Division began its advance up the east bank of the Tigris to the British railhead of Tikrit and was concentrated there by 18 October. The problem was the strong Turkish position on the Little Zab river and the Fat-Ha gorge, 35 miles further on. Rather than make a direct assault with the untried 18th Indian Division, the British Corps commander, Lt-Gen Sir Alexander Cobbe, VC, chose to outflank the gorge with a mobile column.

Covered by the 55th Indian Bde, 337th Bde moved into position during the night of 22/23 October and by morning was within a mile of the Fat-Ha trenches, registering guns on its targets. Advancing after dark, the infantry found the outflanked trenches abandoned, and 53rd Indian Brigade passed through the gorge, followed by 337th Bde, despite the appalling terrain for hauling guns. By 11.15 the following day, the division had reached Tell-ad-Dhahab, and cavalry patrols were across the Little Zab. Next day, 25 October, the advance continued, with 53rd Indian Bde and C/337 Bty reaching the Shumait Ford early in the morning, followed by the rest of the artillery. By noon, the three field batteries of 337th Bde were in action, in the open in full view of the enemy but with magnificent observation posts (OPs) on a nearby hill. 341 (H) Battery reached the Tigris–Little Zab junction and came into action at close range, but was suddenly hit by accurate Turkish shellfire, losing all but two guns, most of its wagons and several men. However, its action allowed C/337 Bty to come into action a couple of miles away undisturbed, and for more of the corps artillery to close up and support the infantry crossing.

By 12.30 the following day, 337th Bde was across the Little Zab and engaging enemy guns. Once again, the position was outflanked by the mobile column, and early on 27 October patrols found the Turkish trenches empty. 53rd Indian Brigade, with A/337 Bty and the surviving section of 341 (H) Bty, was ordered forward to take up position opposite Sharqat on the west bank of the Tigris, later joined by C/337 Bty. At dawn, on 28 October, the Battle of Sharqat opened, with the guns on the east bank firing across the river, A/337 Bty later crossing the Tigris by a ford and galloping up to join in. The following morning C/337 Bty also crossed to the west bank where an afternoon attack made good progress, A/337 Bty supporting a charge by the 13th Hussars. The force on the west bank was about to attack Sharqat on the morning of 30 October, when the Turks in the town surrendered.

The commander of 18th Indian Division, Maj-Gen Hew Fanshawe, was immediately sent on with a mobile column including A/337 Bty to destroy the remaining Turkish forces and capture Mosul. The column forded the Tigris, with artillery horses assisting the mule carts, and pushed on to the city which fell without a fight after news arrived of the signing of the Armistice of Mudros and the end of hostilities on 31 October.

At the end of the war, 18th Indian Division was selected to form part of the occupation force in Iraq and served during the Iraq Rebellion of 1920 before being broken up in 1921.

== Interwar ==
=== 59th (Home Counties) (Cinque Ports) Brigade ===
The 3rd Home Counties Brigade (now with 1st to 4th Kent Batteries) reformed on 7 February 1920. When the TF was reorganised as the Territorial Army in 1921, it was designated the 59th (Home Counties) Brigade, RFA, with the second subtitle 'Cinque Ports' added the following year:

59th (Home Counties) (Cinque Ports) Brigade, RFA

- HQ at Drill Hall, Liverpool Street, Dover
- 233 (Kent) Battery at Dover
- 234 (Kent) Battery (Howitzer) at Shallon Street, Folkestone
- 235 (Kent) Battery at Victoria Road, Margate
- 236 (Kent) Battery at Grove Terrace, Deal (to Ramsgate in 1938)

Its CO on re-formation was Brevet Lt-Col the Hon Hugh Scarlett, DSO. One of the officers was Major John Morley Stebbings, who as a young officer had won the Edward Medal leading a rescue party of eight men from his battery into the ruins of the Uplees explosives factory near Faversham after the Great Explosion on 2 April 1916. He had subsequently won a Military Cross (MC) on the Western Front. 1st Battalion The Buffs Cadet Corps was attached to the unit. The brigade was once again assigned as divisional artillery to 44th (Home Counties) Division. On 1 June 1924, the RFA was subsumed into the Royal Artillery and its brigades redesignated Field Brigades, RA.

=== 75th (Home Counties) (Cinque Ports) AA Regiment ===
In the 1930s, the increasing need for anti-aircraft (AA) defence for Britain's cities was addressed by converting a number of TA units to the AA role. 59th Field Brigade was one of these. First, in February 1938, the howitzer battery (234) at Folkestone was detached to become 223 (Cinque Ports) Independent AA Battery; the numbering of the other batteries was changed, so that 236 Bty at Deal took the number 234. Then, on 1 November 1938, the rest of the brigade was converted, becoming 75th (Home Counties) (Cinque Ports) Anti-Aircraft Brigade under the command of Lt-Col Stebbings, and 223 Bty rejoined. The RA's AA 'brigades' were redesignated 'regiments' on 1 January 1939.

With the expansion of the TA after the Munich Crisis, most units split to form duplicates. In the case of 75th, the CO, Lt-Col Stebbings, left with 234th and 235th Batteries on 1 April 1939 to form a new 89th (Cinque Ports) AA Regiment. The second-in-command, Major N.V. Sadler, was promoted to command the 75th AA Rgt and a new battery was raised at Ashford to give the following organisation:

75th (Home Counties) (Cinque Ports) AA Regiment

- HQ at Drill Hall, Liverpool St, Dover
- 223 (Cinque Ports) AA Bty at Shallon St, Folkestone
- 233 (Kent) AA Bty at Drill Hall, Liverpool St, Dover
- 306 AA Bty at Ashford

Both new regiments were under the command of 28th (Thames & Medway) AA Brigade in 6th AA Division of Anti-Aircraft Command.

== World War II ==
=== Mobilisation ===
In June 1939, as the international situation worsened, a partial mobilisation of the TA was begun in a process known as 'couverture', whereby each AA unit did a month's tour of duty in rotation to man selected AA gun positions. Full mobilisation of AA Command came in August 1939, ahead of the declaration of war on 3 September 1939.

306 AA Battery joined 89th HAA Rgt on 30 August, and then departed for training, returning to 75th HAA Rgt in May 1940.

From 1 June 1940, those AA units armed with 3-inch or the more modern 3.7-inch guns were termed 'Heavy AA' (HAA) to distinguish them for the Light AA units then being formed.

=== Battle of Britain ===
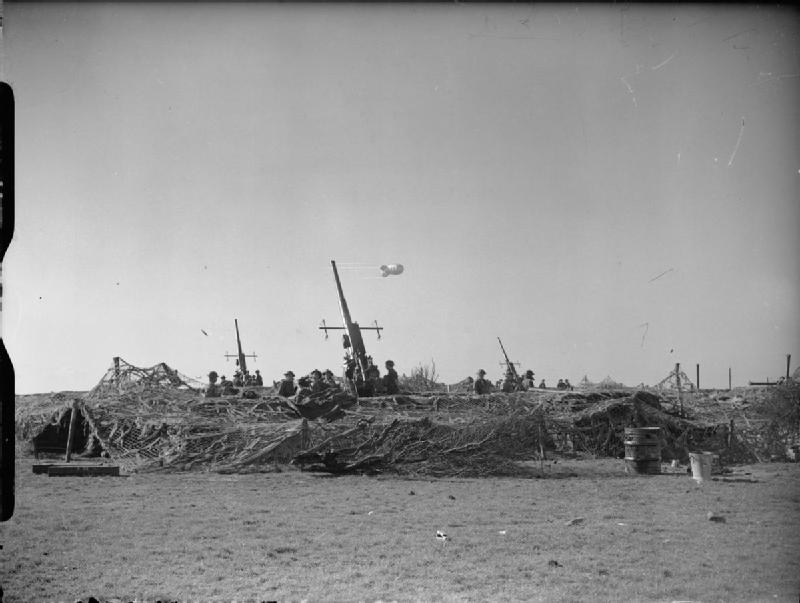
3.7-inch guns of 75th HAA Regiment at Dover, 1940.

The Luftwaffe began its bombing offensive against the British mainland with small-scale raids on coastal targets, then in July 1940 began heavy daylight raids against south coast ports and shipping: the guns at Dover were in action virtually every day. 205 Battery temporarily rejoined from 89th HAA Rgt to boost the numbers of guns at Dover. Lieutenant-Colonel N.V. Sadler of 75th HAA Rgt developed an effective system of HAA barrages over individual points in Dover Harbour and the shipping channels, underpinned by LAA fire. In one day, the regiment shot down seven Junkers Ju 87 'Stukas' together with two Messerschmitt Bf 109s and a Dornier Do 215.

Sadler, who had won a Distinguished Conduct Medal in the ranks during World War I, was commissioned into 59th Field Bde between the wars. At the end of 1940, he was promoted to Brigadier and sent to Malta as AA Defence Commander during the Siege.

28th AA Brigade had responsibility for the 'Thames South' defences as well as Dover, and at times part of 75th HAA Rgt was transferred to 37th AA Bde responsible for 'Thames North' on the Essex bank of the Thames Estuary. These concentrations of HAA guns were in frequent action by day and night during the Battle of Britain and the early part of The Blitz as Luftwaffe bombers came up the estuary to target London, Chatham, and the docks along the river.

=== Blitz ===
On 24 November 1940, as the night-bombing 'Blitz' against British cities got under way, the regiment was shifted to strengthen the defences in Northern England, joining 62nd AA Bde in 10th AA Division, covering Leeds and Sheffield with one battery detached to Derby.

The regiment sent a cadre of experienced officers and other ranks to 211th HAA Training Rgt at Oswestry to provide the basis for a new 422 HAA Bty; this was formed on 10 April 1941 and joined the regiment on 7 July. The regiment sent another cadre to 206th HAA Training Rgt at Arborfield for 463 HAA Bty; this was formed on 7 August 1941 and later joined 133rd HAA Rgt. The regiment sent a final cadre to 207th HAA Training Rgt at Devizes for 542 (Mixed) HAA Bty, formed on 5 March 1942, which joined 159th (Mixed) HAA Rgt ('Mixed' units were those in which women from the Auxiliary Territorial Service were integrated).

During the summer of 1941, the regiment moved back to 37th AA Bde in 6th AA Division. The brigade was being reorganised, and for a while in the winter of 1941-42, the 75th was the only unit under its command. 422 Bty was sometimes detached to 28th AA Bde in 'Thames South', and on 30 March 1942 it was permanently transferred to 127th HAA Rgt in that formation, leaving 75th HAA Rgt with the three-battery establishment required for overseas service. Later that month, 75th HAA Rgt left Anti-Aircraft Command in preparation for going overseas.

=== Iraq ===
The regiment left the UK in August 1942 and joined GHQ Persia and Iraq Command (PAIFORCE) in Iraq in October. The role of PAIFORCE was to protect the vital oilfields of the Middle East against a potential German incursion through the Caucasus. The AA units had to cover oil installations, ports, rail lines and airfields, for which 75th HAA Rgt was placed under the command of the newly reconstituted 4th AA Brigade. In the event, the Luftwaffe was never able to penetrate Iraq from its airfields in Russia, and PAIFORCE had a quiet war. As the Germans were pushed back on the Eastern Front there was a general run-down of British forces in PAIFORCE, but 75th HAA Rgt remained until May 1944, when it moved to Middle East Command with 4th AA Bde.

75th (Home Counties) (Cinque Ports) HAA Rgt with its three batteries (223, 233 and 306) was placed in suspended animation on 11 July 1944.

== Postwar ==
When the TA was reconstituted on 1 January 1947, 75th HAA Rgt was reformed as 259 (Mobile) HAA Rgt (Home Counties) (Cinque Ports), RA. (Note: A new and unrelated 75th HAA Rgt was formed on 1 April 1947 by the redesignation of the war-formed 143rd HAA Rgt)The regiment came under the command of 53rd AA Brigade (the former 27th (Home Counties) AA Bde) based at Dover, part of 1 AA Group.

AA Command was disbanded on 1 March 1955 and there was a major reduction in AA units. 259 (Mobile) HAA Rgt was placed in suspended animation, and the following year merged with part of 11th AA (Mixed) Signal Regiment, Royal Corps of Signals (the signal unit for 1 AA Group). The merged unit was designated Home Counties District (Mixed) Signal Regiment with HQ at Shorncliffe. ('Mixed' indicated that members of the Women's Royal Army Corps were integrated into the unit.) The unit became 62 (Mixed) Signal Regiment in 1959, regained its 'Cinque Ports' subtitle in 1960, and merged with 44 (Home Counties) Signal Regiment in 1961. In 1967, the merged unit became 44 (Cinque Ports) Signal Squadron in 36 (Eastern) Signal Regiment, which was reduced to 844 Cinque Ports Signal Troop in 2010.

== Uniforms and Insignia ==
The full dress of the original artillery volunteers was based on that of the RA, but for ordinary parade the men wore a loose undress tunic and trousers of blue Baize. The 4th Battery of the 6th (Hastings) AVC, however, wore a naval uniform with sailors' caps until 1872. The badge of the Cinque Ports artillery volunteers was the Coat of arms of the Cinque Ports surrounded by a circlet. On officers' pouches the circlet carried the motto 'PRO ARIS ET FOCIS' (For hearth and home); on later tunic buttons and belt clasps shared with the rifle volunteers the circlet was inscribed 'CINQUE PORTS VOLUNTEERS'.

From 1953 to 1955, 259 HAA Rgt wore an embroidered arm badge with 'CINQUE PORTS' beneath 'ROYAL ARTILLERY' in red on a navy blue backing.

== Honorary Colonels ==
The following served as Honorary Colonel of the unit:

- 2nd Earl Granville, KG, Lord Warden of the Cinque Ports, appointed 23 April 1866
- Edward Vernon Harcourt, former CO, appointed 7 August 1872
- Lord Northbourne, appointed 10 August 1898
- Col F.G. Hayward, TD, appointed 22 September 1923
- Field Marshal Lord Birdwood, appointed 14 January 1939

== Memorial ==
There is a WWII memorial plaque to the men of 75 (Cinque Ports) HAA Rgt in St Mary in Castro Church at Dover Castle.
