= 31st (City of London) Signal Regiment =

Signals Regiment of the British Army

31st (Greater London) Signal Regiment
- Active: 1967—2010
- Country: United Kingdom
- Branch: British Army: Royal Corps of Signals
- Type: Signals Regiment
- Role: Military Communications
- Size: Regiment
- Part of: 2nd (National Communications) Signal Brigade
- Garrison/HQ: Hammersmith
- Nickname: 31 Signal Regiment
- Last Communications Equipment: HF Communications
- Engagements: Operation Telic
- Website: 31 (Greater London) Signal Regiment (Volunteers)

The 31st (Greater London) Signal Regiment was a territorial communications regiment of the British Army's Royal Corps of Signals. The regiment first formed following the creation of the Territorial and Army Volunteer Reserve in 1967 after the 1966 Defence White Paper. After seeing limited reserve support during the Cold War, the regiment was disbanded in 2010 following the initial Army 2020 reform.

== History ==
Following the announcement of the 1966 Defence White Paper, new "large" regiments were formed within the new Territorial and Army Volunteer Reserve. Although more focused on the infantry corps and royal artillery, the royal corps of signals did see some changes including new TA regiments. On 1 April 1967 the 31st (Greater London) Signals Regiment was formed with the following regiments being the "parent" units;

- 41st (Princess Louises's Kensington Regiment) Signal Regiment (TA) becoming 41 Squadron
- 47th (The Duke of Cambridge's Middlesex Hussars (Yeomanry)) Signal Regiment (TA) becoming 47 Squadron
- 83rd (East Anglian) District Signal Regiment (AER) becoming 83 Squadron (kept Army Emergency Reserve number)

After formation the regimental headquarters were located at Hammersmith where they would remain for almost 30 years. After organising the regiment was assigned to the 11th Signal Group (V) as the reserve trunk communications signal regiment for SHAPE. By 1992 the regiment was moved under control of the 2nd (National Communications) Signal Brigade and provided communications for the City of London and general County of London area.

In 1994, the regimental headquarters moved to Wandsworth Barracks in Southfields where it remained until disbandment. During this period, the regiment had links with the Worshipful Company of Innholders and the London University Officer's Training Corps. During the initial Operation Telic invasion, volunteers of the regiment served in Iraq with their regular counterparts.

In 2010 the regiment was disbanded following the concurrent disbandment of the 2nd Signal Brigade and the re-organisation of the TA signals as a result of the Army 2020 reform. Although the RHQ was disbanded, all squadrons' titles, lineages, and roles were all retained, with most squadrons moving to the other London signals regiment, 71st (City of London) Yeomanry Signal Regiment (V).

== Organisation ==
Organisation of the regiment during its existence;

- Regimental Headquarters, Hammersmith
- 5 (The Queen's Own Oxfordshire Hussars (Yeomanry)) Signal Squadron (V), Banbury supporting 145th (Home Counties) Brigade
- 41 (Princess Louise's Kensington Regiment) Signal Squadron (V), Coulsdon and Hammersmith (from General Headquarters Signal Regiment) providing high frequency communications.
- 47 (The Duke of Cambridge's Middlesex Hussars (Yeomanry)) Signal Squadron (V), Harrow, later Uxbridge (leaving in November 1995 following Front Line First reform) (from Cavalry Division Signals and London Corps Signal Regiments)
- 56 (London) Signal Squadron (V), Eastbourne (leaving in November 1995 following Front Line First reform, returning in 2006) (from London Division Signals) supporting 2nd (South East) Brigade
- 83 (London) Signal Squadron (V), Southfields, later Chelsea (from 6th Anti-Aircraft Divisional Signals) later HQ Support Squadron in 2006

== Regimental Lineages ==
The regiment, along with the other London Regiments, maintained the following battalion's/regiment's lineages and traditions;

- 13th (Kensington) County of London Battalion London Regiment
- 25th County of London Cyclist Battalion The London Regiment

== Sources ==
- Lord, Cliff, and Graham, Watson. The Royal Corps of Signals : unit histories of the Corps (1920-2001) and its antecedents. Watson, Graham, writer on military forces,. Solihull, West Midlands, England. ISBN 9781874622925. OCLC 184820114.
- "History | 31st (City of London) Signal Regiment (Volunteers)". web.archive.org. 2008-10-13. Retrieved 2019-10-25.
