= 44th (Home Counties) Signal Regiment =

Home Counties Divisional Telegraph Company 44th (Home Counties) Divisional Signals 44 (Home Counties) Signal Regiment 44 (Cinque Ports) Signal Squadron
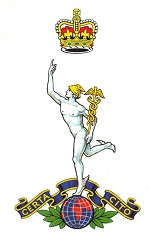
- Badge of the Royal Corps of Signals
- Active: 1908–2009
- Country: United Kingdom
- Branch: Territorial Army
- Role: Signals
- Part of: 44th (Home Counties) Division; 67th (2nd Home Counties) Division; 12th (Eastern) Infantry Division; 36 (Eastern) Signal Regiment
- Garrison/HQ: Brighton; Ravensourt Park; Grays
- Engagements: First World War: Second Battle of Ypres; Battle of Loos; Salonika; Second World War: Battle of France; Second Battle of Alamein

44 (Home Counties) Signal Regiment was a Territorial Army (TA) unit of the British Army's Royal Corps of Signals. It had its origins in a Volunteer unit of the Royal Engineers (RE) formed in the 1890s. It provided the divisional signals for the 44th (Home Counties) Division and its duplicates in both World Wars, also seeing active service with 28th Division in the First World War. Its successor continued in the postwar TA and Army Reserve.

== Origin ==
When the Volunteer Force was subsumed into the new Territorial Force (TF) under the Haldane Reforms in 1908, the former 1st Sussex Engineer Volunteer Corps provided the divisional engineers for the TF's Home Counties Division, including the Home Counties Divisional Telegraph Company with the following organisation:

- Company Headquarters at 23 Gloucester Place, Brighton
- No 1 Section at Brighton
- No 2 (Surrey) Section
- No 3 (Kent) Section
- No 4 (Middlesex) Section

Nos 2–4 Sections were attached to and largely manned by the three infantry brigades of the division. The Telegraph Company was redesignated a Signal Company in 1911.

== First World War ==
=== Mobilisation ===
The Signal Company had been with the Home Counties Division on Salisbury Plain for its annual training when the order came to mobilise on 4 August 1914. The unit returned to Brighton and was embodied the following day. Shortly afterwards, TF units were invited to volunteer for overseas service. Early in September battalions of the Home Counties Division began to relieve Regular units at Gibraltar, then in October the infantry and artillery of the whole division embarked for garrison service in India. Although it did later receive a number (44th), the Home Counties Division never operated as a formation during the war: its units remained scattered in colonial garrisons or were attached to Indian divisions. The Divisional RE remained in England to support Regular formations: the Signal Company joined the 28th Division, which was forming at Winchester primarily from units returned from service in India.

On 31 August, the formation of a reserve or 2nd Line unit was authorised for each 1st Line unit where 60 per cent or more of the men had volunteered for Overseas Service. The titles of these 2nd Line units would be the same as the original, but distinguished by a '2' prefix. In this way duplicate battalions, brigades and divisions were created, mirroring those TF formations being sent overseas. Later 3rd Line units were formed to supply drafts to the 1st and 2nd Lines.

Formation sign of the 28th Division, a strip of red cloth on the shoulder strap.

=== 1st Home Counties Signal Company ===
1st Home Counties Signal Company joined 28th Division at Winchester on 5 January 1915 and provided its communications until beyond the end of the war. The division embarked at Southampton 15–18 January, disembarking at Le Havre 16–19 January, and concentrated between Bailleul and Hazebrouck by 22 January. While on the Western Front it participated in the following actions:

- Battle of Gravenstafel Ridge (22–23 April)
- Battle of St Julien (24 April–4 May)
- Battle of Frezenberg Ridge (8–13 May)
- Battle of Bellewaarde Ridge (24–25 May)
- Battle of Loos (27 September–5 October)

At noon on 19 October 1915 the division was ordered to leave for an unknown destination within 48 hours. The Signals Company entrained on 20 October, embarked at Marseille on 24 October and arrived at Alexandria in Egypt on 29 October. The division then embarked again for the Macedonian front, the Signal Company arriving at Salonika on 16 December 1915, joining the division on the River Struma.

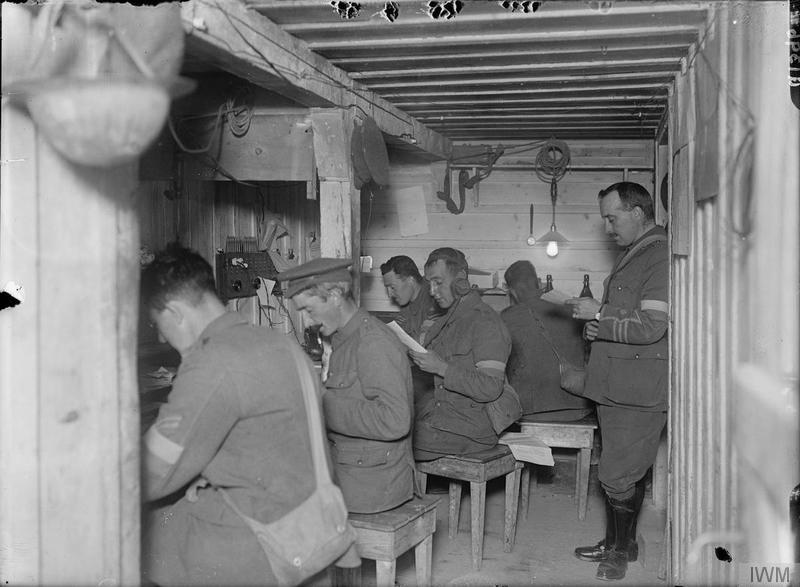
An RE Signal Company at work on the Western Front.

28th Division spent the rest of the war on this front, where there were few major actions, but the troops suffered steady attrition through trench warfare casualties and sickness. A year after its arrival it took part in the occupation of Mazirko and the capture of Bairakli Jum'a. In May 1917 it captured Ferdie and Essex Trenches near Bairakli Jum'a, and in October it captured Nairakli and Kumli. Finally, on 18 and 19 September 1918, 28th Division took part in the Battle of Doiran and the subsequent pursuit of the defeated Bulgarian Army up the Strumica Valley. On 29 September Bulgaria concluded the Armistice of Salonica with the Allies. This was followed a month later by the Armistice of Mudros with the Turks. Early in November the 28th Division was sent to occupy Constantinople and the Dardanelles Forts, with Divisional HQ at Chanak (Çanakkale).

28th Division remained in these positions, though its units (including 28th Divisional Signal Company of the new Royal Corps of Signals) were progressively manned by Regulars after the remaining TF men were demobilised. In July 1922, 28th Division was moved to interpose between the Greek and Turkish armies (the Chanak Crisis). After a ceasefire was arranged, the British troops were progressively reduced. On 2 October 1923 the final evacuation took place, and 28th Division was disbanded.

=== 2nd Home Counties Signal Company ===
2nd Home Counties Signal Co was formed at Brighton and the 2nd Home Counties Division began to assemble around Windsor in November 1914. There was a shortage of equipment with which to train – only a few old .256-in Japanese Ariska rifles were available. In July 1915 the units had to be reorganised as TF men who had only signed up for Home Service were transferred to Home Defence brigades (termed Provisional Brigades). A few Home Counties men probably joined 9th Provisional Signal Section in 9th Provisional Brigade, formed in Kent predominantly from East Lancashire units. The 2nd HC Division was redesignated 67th (2nd Home Counties) Division in August 1915 and the signal company became 67th (2nd HC) Signal Co. In November the division became part of Second Army, Central Force, and was quartered in Kent, the Signal Co HQ located with divisional HQ (DHQ) at Canterbury. On 19 January 1916 the sections left to join their respective brigades.

67th (2nd HC) Division had the dual role of home defence and supplying drafts to units serving overseas. It was twice warned for service in Ireland and in April 1917 for service on the Western Front, but these deployments never materialised and the division spent the whole war in England. During the winter of 1917–18 the division moved to Essex, where it joined XXIII Corps. DHQ and Signals were at Colchester. The units maintained these dispositions until after the Armistice with Germany, when demobilisation began. In March 1919 the remaining RE units began to disband, and the process was soon completed.

== Royal Signals ==
When the TF was reconstituted as the Territorial Army (TA) in 1920–1, a new 44th (Home Counties) Divisional Signals (Note: Divisional signal units of the Royal Signals 1920–45 were battalion-sized and commanded by a Lieutenant-Colonel; they were not termed 'regiments' until 1946.) was formed by the newly-formed Royal Corps of Signals (RCS). It combined the former 44th (HC) Signal Company, RE, with 10th Battalion, Middlesex Regiment. Headquarters was at Stamford Brook Lodge, Ravenscourt Park, West London (the former HQ of the 10th Middlesex), with 2 Company at Brighton and sections at New Southgate, Chatham and Hurstpierpoint. (Note: In the 1920s the Royal Signals' journal, The Wire, was published from Stamford Brook Lodge.)

By the 1930s, 44th (HC) Signals also administered:

- 226th Field Artillery Signal Section, Drill Hall, Gloucester Road, Brighton
- 227th Field Artillery Signal Section, Drill Hall, Hurstpierpoint, later at Drill Hall, Bognor Regis
- 203rd Medium Artillery Signal Section, Fort Pitt, Chatham

The 4th Cadet Battalion of the Middlesex Regiment was also attached to the unit.

== Second World War ==
=== Mobilisation ===
Following the Munich Crisis the TA was doubled in size. Once again, 44th (HC) Division formed a duplicate, 12th (Eastern) Infantry Division, with its own divisional signals. 44th (HC) Division was mobilised on 3 September 1939 and 12th (E) Division became active on 7 October 1939.

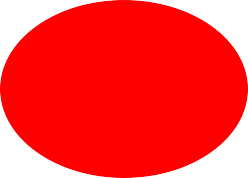
44th (Home Counties) Division's formation sign.

=== 44th (Home Counties) Divisional Signals ===
44th (HC) Division embarked for France on 1 April 1940 to join the new British Expeditionary Force (BEF).

==== Dunkirk ====
When the German offensive in the west opened on 10 May, the BEF advanced into Belgium in accordance with 'Plan D'. 44th (HC) Division moved up to the Escaut, where it was in reserve. However, the German Army broke through the Ardennes to the east, forcing the BEF to withdraw again, and by 19 May the whole force was back across the Escaut. 44th (HC) Division tried to hold the most dangerous point, but the Germans established bridgeheads across the Escaut at dawn on 20 May. The attack was renewed on 22 May and the division was badly chewed up, but there was no breakthrough: it was the deep penetration further east that forced the BEF to withdraw. Next day the BEF fell back to the 'Canal Line', and 44th (HC) Division was withdrawn into reserve.

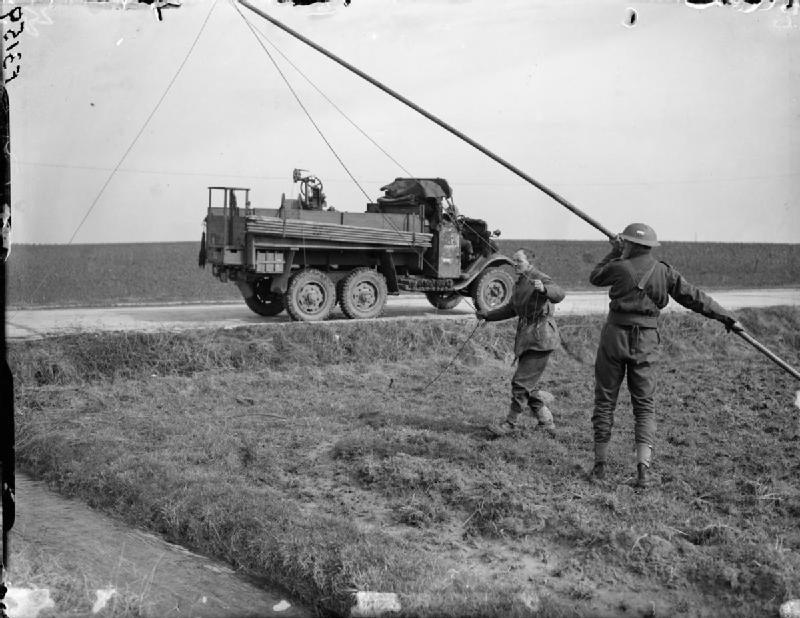
Royal Signals erecting cable poles in France, 1940.

Cut off, the BEF fell back towards the coast, with 44th (HC) Division given the responsibility of defending the area round Hazebrouck. On 26 May the decision was made to evacuate the BEF through Dunkirk (Operation Dynamo). 44th (HC) Division was heavily attacked by German Panzer divisions on 27 May, but fought on doggedly until ordered to withdraw, by which time the enemy's advanced columns had penetrated between its widely-spread units. With its flanks 'in the air' after neighbouring French formations retreated during the night of 28/29 May, the divisional commander decided to withdraw some 6 miles (9.7 km) to Mont des Cats, a strong position held by the divisional artillery and some of the divisional RE acting as infantry, though only DHQ and scattered elements reached the Mont by dawn to join them. This rearguard was subjected to intense mortar fire next morning, then by dive-bombing, but held its position for 30 hours while the rest of the division withdrew. The remnants of the division reached the beaches for embarkation, reaching England on 1 June.

==== Home Defence ====
On return to England, 44th (HC) Division was briefly in Southern Command, then until October in North East England with I Corps before returning to invasion-threatened South East England with XII Corps. In April 1942 the division came under War Office control preparatory to going overseas, and on 29 May it embarked for Egypt.

==== North Africa ====
44th (HC) Division arrived in Egypt on 24 July, shortly after Eighth Army had retreated to the El Alamein position. On 15 August it was assigned to XIII Corps before General Rommel attacked the El Alamein line (the Battle of Alam el Halfa). The division held the Alam Halfa ridge when the attack came in on 30 August. Over the next two days the Panzers made repeated attacks but 44th (HC) Division held its position and by 3 September the division was counter-attacking.

For Eighth Army's counter-offensive (the Second Battle of Alamein), 44th (HC) Division was to lead one of XIII Corps' thrusts through the enemy minefields on the first night, 23/24 October (Operation Lightfoot). A route was found through the first belt of minefields ('January') on the first night and 44th (HC) Division succeeded in passing the second minefield ('February') the next night, but the armour was unable to exploit beyond.

The second phase of the offensive, Operation Supercharge, was launched on the night of 27/28 October. Eventually, the armour broke through, and next day came signs that the enemy was withdrawing. 44th (HC) Division took some part in the pursuit to El Agheila, collecting prisoners, but XIII Corps was short of transport and was left behind as Eighth Army drove westwards. Shortly afterwards 44th (HC) Division HQ was disbanded, and its units distributed. The personnel of 44th (HC) Divisional Signals were used to reinforce XXX Corps Signals, 7th Armoured Division Signals and No 4 Line of Communication (LoC) Signals.

12th (Eastern) Divisional sign.

=== 12th (Eastern) Divisional Signals ===
In April 1940, three of the new duplicate TA divisions under training, including the 12th (Eastern) Infantry Division, were sent to France to act as labour troops to work on airfields and Lines of Communication (LoC). Elements of the divisional signal unit went to France for the LoCs, but not the complete unit. On 17 May, after the BEF was forced to withdraw from the Dyle Line, 12th (E) Division was ordered to concentrate in the neighbourhood of Amiens. The infantry only had their personal small arms, and meagre artillery support had to be improvised. The following day the division was covering the important traffic centres of Albert, Doullens, Amiens and Abbeville together with two equally ill-equipped brigades of 23rd (Northumbrian) Division, all under the commander of 12th (E) Division, Maj-Gen R.L Petre and known as 'Petreforce'. Petreforce at the time was the only thing between seven advancing Panzer divisions and the sea. The raw Territorials held up the German advance for 5 hours, allowing the BEF to continue its retreat towards Dunkirk.

The survivors of 12th (E) Division then made their way to the coast and got out of France through Dunkirk and other evacuation ports, the division finally reaching England on 8 June. Its casualties were so severe that it was broken up on 10 July, with the divisional signals sending reinforcements to 44th (HC) Signals and 1 Army Signal Training Regiment in the UK and to the Middle East, including No 3 LoC Signals and Sudan Signals.

== Postwar ==
When the TA was reconstituted in 1947, the unit reformed at Gillingham, Kent, as 44 (Home Counties) Divisional Signal Regiment with the following organisation:

- Regimental HQ at Stamford Brook
- 1 Squadron at Stamford Brook
- 2 Squadron at Brighton
- 3 Squadron at Chatham

In 1957, 2 Sqn moved to Bromley, but E, F and G Troops remained at Brighton and a new K troop was formed at Richmond-upon-Thames.

When the TA was reorganised in 1961, the division became 44th (Home Counties) Division/District and the regiment absorbed the district signal unit, 62 (Mixed) Signal Regiment (Cinque Ports). This had been formed in Anti-Aircraft Command in 1947 as 11th AA (Mixed) Signal Rgt from elements of the wartime 1 and 2 AA Group Signals. The subtitle 'Mixed' indicated that members of the Women's Royal Army Corps were integrated into the unit. After AA Command was disbanded in 1955 the regiment merged with 259 (Mixed) Heavy Anti-Aircraft Regiment, Royal Artillery, (Home Counties) (Cinque Ports). Based at Shorncliffe, the unit was numbered as 62 Signal Rgt in 1959 and adopted the 'Cinque Ports' subtitle the following year. The merged regiment also took this historic title, as 44 (Home Counties) Signal Regiment (Cinque Ports) The merged regiment also took on administrative responsibility for two brigade signal sqns in 44 (HC) Division:

- 329 Sqn formed in 1959 at Bromley from 131 (Surrey) Infantry Bde Signals
- 330 Sqn formed in 1959 at Tunbridge Wells from 133 (Kent & Sussex) Infantry Bde Signals

When the TA was reduced into the Territorial and Army Volunteer Reserve (TAVR) in 1967 the regiment became a single squadron (44 (Cinque Ports) Sqn) at Gillingham in 36 (Eastern) Signal Regiment. In March 1969 it formed 858 (Corps) Trp at Eastbourne and 859 Trp at Ilford, which moved to Eastbourne in 1970. The role of these Trps was to reinforce the Regular 22 Signal Rgt in British Army of the Rhine. These two Trps combined on 30 November 1977 to reform the disbanded 56 Signal Sqn.

In 1992 44 Sqn's HQ moved to Grays, Essex, and a sub-unit was formed at Prittlewell, Southend-on-Sea, from a troop from 70 (Essex Yeomanry) Signal Sqn, a platoon of 10th Battalion, Parachute Regiment, and part of 215 Transport Sqn, Royal Corps of Transport, giving the following organisation:

- SHQ at Grays
- 747 and 748 Trps at Grays
- 746 and 749 Trps at Prittlewell

Under the Strategic Review of Reserves in 2009, 36 (Eastern) Signal Rgt was reduced to 36 (Essex Yeomanry) Signal Sqn at Colchester, including 844 (Cinque Ports) Signal Troop.

== Commanding Officers ==
Unit commanders included the following:

Home Counties Divisional Signal Co, RE:

- Capt H.C. Saunders, commissioned 25 January 1908

44th (Home Counties) Divisional Signals:

- Lt-Col A.S. Angwin, DSO, MC, TD, 1920 (later Col Sir Stanley Angwin, President of the Institution of Electrical Engineers)
- Lt-Col R.E. Coleman, OBE, TD, 1927
- Lt-Col F. Reid, MC, TD, 1932
- Lt-Col A.H. Read, TD, 1936
- Lt-Col L.H. Harris, 1939–40
- Lt-Col F.K. Morton, 1940–42
- Lt-Col R.F. Gandy, 1947
- Lt-Col D.N. Deakin 1950
- Lt-Col K.B. Baldwin, MBE, TD, 1951
- Lt-Col A.A. Bradshaw, 1955

12th (Eastern) Divisional Signals:

- Lt-Col F. Reid, MC, TD, 1939–40

== Honorary Colonel ==
The following served as Honorary Colonel of the unit:

- Lt-Col R.R. Kimmitt, OBE, TD, appointed 18 April 1928, retired 5 July 1933
- Maj Frederick Keogh, TD, appointed 5 July 1933
- Col John Sclater-Booth, 3rd Lord Basing, TD, appointed 29 October 1934
- Brig-Gen R.C.A. McCalmont, CVO, DSO, appointed 16 July 1937
- Brig Sir Lionel Harris, KBE, TD, former CO and Engineer-in-Chief, General Post Office, appointed 1950

== External sources ==
- The Long, Long Trail
- Orders of Battle at Patriot Files
- Land Forces of Britain, the Empire and Commonwealth – Regiments.org (archive site)
