= London District Signals =

- Active: 1908–present
- Country: United Kingdom
- Branch: Territorial Army
- Type: HQ Signals unit
- Part of: Royal Engineers (1908–20); Royal Corps of Signals (1920–)
- Engagements: Gallipoli; Western Front; The Blitz; Operation Diver

London District Signals was a headquarters signal unit of the Royal Engineers (RE) and later Royal Corps of Signals in Britain's Territorial Army from 1908. It served with a corps headquarters at Gallipoli and on the Western Front during World War I, and later became an air defence signal unit during World War II. Its successor unit continues in the Army Reserve today.

== Origin ==
When the Territorial Force was created in 1908 as a result of the Haldane Reforms, the London Division, Electrical Engineers of the Royal Engineers (Volunteers) spun off three telegraph companies, later termed signal companies:

- London Wireless Signal Company
- London Cable Signal Company
- London Air-Line Signal Company

Together, these companies formed London District Signals, defined as 'Army Troops RE' in the TF organisation, serving HQ London District based at Horse Guards. The unit headquarters was at 12 Palmer Street, Westminster.

== World War I ==
On the outbreak of war in August 1914, the London Wireless Signal Company was temporarily attached to 1st Mounted Division, but had left by March 1915. On 3 November 1914, a London Motor Airline Section embarked for the Western Front. In June 1915, London District Signals joined IX Corps HQ forming at the Tower of London and went to Gallipoli as IX Corps Signals. After the evacuation from Gallipoli, the Corps HQ went to France and served on the Western Front until the end of the war. The Corps Signals also ran a Signals Training Centre.

== Interwar ==
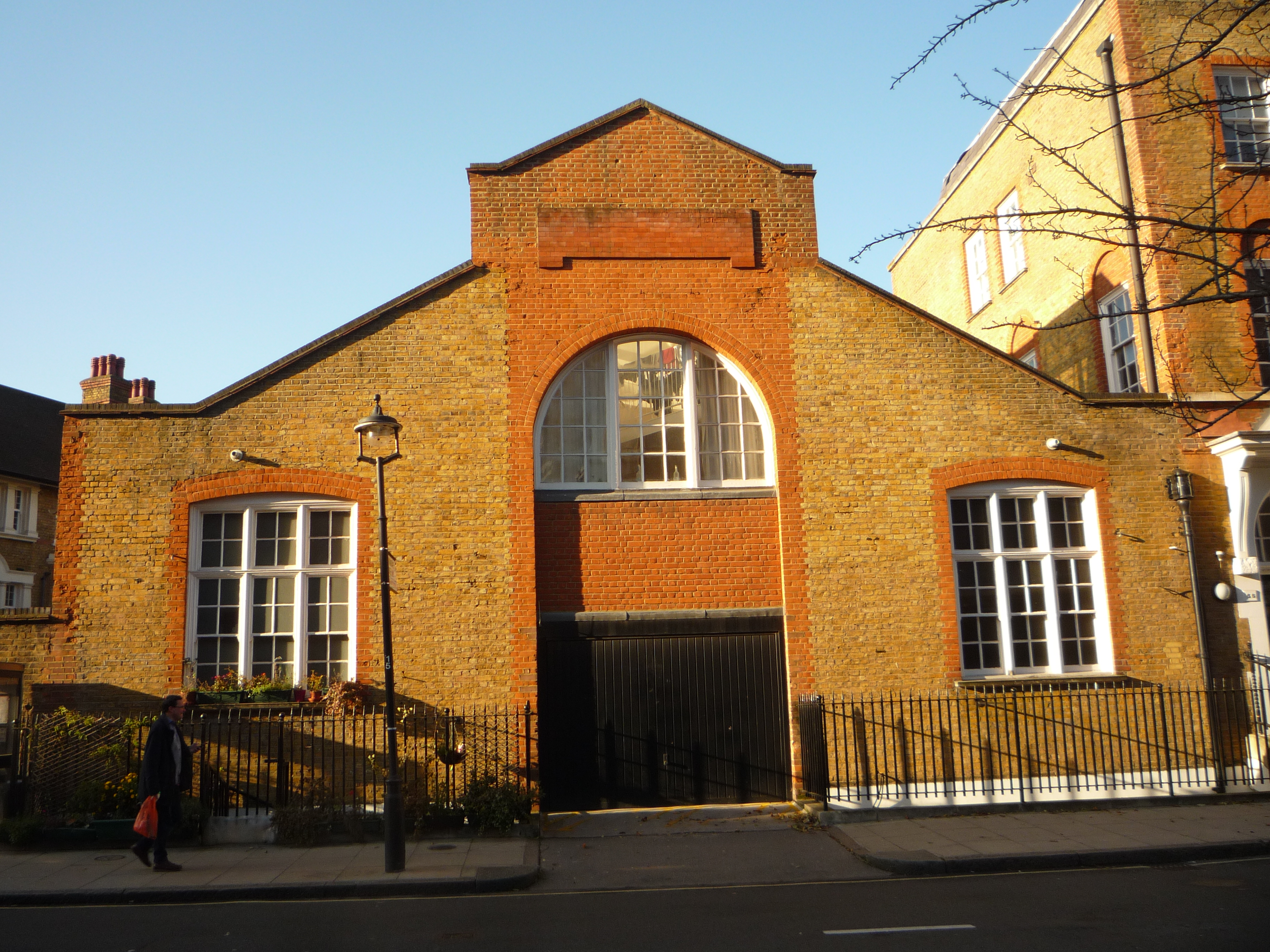
Former Drill Hall of 1st AA Divisional Signals in Regency Street, London SW1

When the renamed Territorial Army (TA) was reconstituted in 1920, London District Signals was reformed as 1st London Corps Signals (Army Troops) in the Royal Corps of Signals. (Note: A new London District Signals was formed in 1939 by 56th (London) Divisional Signals. In 1952, it was reformed as London District Signal Regiment in the Army Emergency Reserve.) It was retitled as Anti-Aircraft Signals in 1922, and then Air Defence Signals in 1925 when it formed 26th (London) and 27th (London) Anti-Aircraft Brigade Signals Companies. When 1st Anti-Aircraft Division was formed at RAF Uxbridge in 1935 (with 26 and 27 AA Bdes under command), the unit provided the signals component. It was based at 46 Regency Street, the former Drill Hall of the London Electrical Engineers. The divisional signals unit was duplicated for 6th Anti-Aircraft Division in 1939, when the TA doubled in size after the Munich Crisis. 6th AA Division took responsibility for the air defence of the Thames estuary, Essex and North Kent, with its HQ at RAF Uxbridge. Just before mobilisation, the regiment organised as:

- Regimental Headquarters at Regency Street, London commanded by Lieutenant Colonel A. Hemsley, MBE, TD
- No.1, 2, and 3 Signal Companies at Regency Street, London
- Cadet Affiliation — 'D' Company, 1st West London Cadet Corps

== World War II ==
Together, 1st and 6th AA Divisions defended London and the Thames Estuary during The Blitz. As the war developed, increasing numbers of women from the Auxiliary Territorial Service (ATS) became integrated into AA and signals units, which were termed 'Mixed'. By June 1942, the composition of the two units was as follows:

1st AA Divisional Signals

- Commanding Officer: Lieutenant-Colonel A. Hemsley, MBE, TD (1939–45)
- 1st AA Divisional Mixed Signal Unit HQ
  - HQ No 1 Company:
    - 1 AA Command Mixed Signal Office Section
    - 1 AA Division Mixed Signal Office Section
    - 26 AA Brigade Signal Office Mixed Sub-Section
    - 38 AA Brigade Signal Office Mixed Sub-Section
    - 48 AA Brigade Signal Office Mixed Sub-Section
    - 49 AA Brigade Signal Office Mixed Sub-Section
  - HQ No 2 Company:
    - 601 AA Gun Operations Room (Class 'D') Mixed Signal Section
    - 315 AA Gun Operations Room (Class 'B') Mixed Signal Section
    - 112 RAF Fighter Sector Sub-Section
    - 5 AA Line Maintenance Section

1st AA Divisional Signals had provided Anti-Aircraft Command's Signals section since the latter's establishment in 1938. Between 1940 and 1942, both 1st and 6th AA Divisions came under 1st AA Corps, but from June 1942, 1st AA Division was directly under AA Command HQ.

6th AA Divisional Signals

- Commanding Officer: Lieutenant-Colonel G.J. Morley-Peel, MBE, TD (1939–44)
- 6th AA Divisional Mixed Signal Unit HQ
  - HQ No 1 Company:
    - 6 AA Division Mixed Signal Office Section
    - 6 AA Brigade Signal Office Mixed Sub-Section
    - 102 RAF Fighter Sector Sub-Section
    - 103 RAF Fighter Sector Sub-Section
    - 329 AA Gun Operations Room (Class 'B') Mixed Signal Section
    - 37 AA Brigade Signal Office Mixed Sub-Section
    - 309 AA Gun Operations Room (Class 'B') Mixed Signal Section
    - 15 AA Line Maintenance Section
  - HQ No 2 Company:
    - 328 AA Gun Operations Room (Class 'B') Mixed Signal Section
    - 28 AA Brigade Signal Office Mixed Sub-Section
    - 56 AA Brigade Signal Office Mixed Sub-Section
    - 101 RAF Fighter Sector Sub-Section
    - 310 AA Gun Operations Room (Class 'B') Mixed Signal Section
    - 71 AA Brigade Signal Office Mixed Sub-Section
    - 16 AA Line Maintenance Section

When AA Command was reorganised in October 1942. the two divisions became 1 AA Group and 2 AA Group, with the signals units renamed 1st and 2nd AA Group (Mixed) Signals. The two groups operated alongside No. 11 Group RAF and took a leading role in the defence against V-1 flying bombs (Operation Diver) in 1944–45.

== Postwar ==
On the re-establishment of the TA in 1947, 1 and 2 AA Group Signals re-merged and were numbered 11 AA (Mixed) Signal Regiment, 'Mixed' now indicating that members of the Women's Royal Army Corps (successors to the ATS) were integrated into the unit. The new unit was based at Kensington. The unit was retained when AA Command was disbanded in 1955, becoming Eastern Command Mixed Signal Regiment, the East Anglian District Signal Regiment of the Army Emergency Reserve (AER). Eastern Command Signal Regiment was numbered 83 Signal Regiment in 1959.

Meanwhile, elements of 11 AA Signal Rgt joined the disbanding 259 (Home Counties) (Cinque Ports) Heavy Anti-Aircraft Regiment, Royal Artillery to form Home Counties District (Mixed) Signal Regiment with HQ at Shorncliffe. This became 62 (Mixed) Signal Regiment (Cinque Ports), and merged with 44 (Home Counties) Signal Regiment in 1961.

The size of the TA was reduced in 1967, when 83 Signal Regiment (AER) became 83 Signal Squadron (Volunteers) and later 83 Support Squadron in 31 (City of London) Signal Regiment, which was disbanded in 2010.

In 2010, 83 Support Sqn was renamed 47 Signal Troop, (recognising the former 47th (2nd London) Division) and became part of 71 (City of London Yeomanry) Signal Regiment. The Troop is based in Uxbridge and Southfields.

== Honorary Colonel ==
The first Honorary Colonel of London District Signals was Col A. Bain, TD, MICE, MIEE, appointed on 14 July 1912.

== Online sources ==
- Air Formation Signals Association
- British Army website
- British Military History
- Great War Forum
- Graham Watson, The Territorial Army 1947
