= 36th (Eastern) Signal Regiment =

36 (Eastern) Signal Regiment
- Cap badge of the Royal Corps of Signals
- Active: 1 April 1967 – 1 April 2010; 59 years, 5 months (regiment); 1 April 2010 – present; 16 years, 5 months (squadron)
- Country: United Kingdom
- Branch: British Army
- Type: Military communications unit
- Size: Regiment, then Squadron from 2009
- Part of: 71st (City of London) Yeomanry Signal Regiment
- Current HQ: Colchester

Insignia
- Regimental Badge

- Tactical Recognition Flash

36 (Eastern) Signal Regiment (36 Signal Regt) was a Territorial Army (TA) signal unit of the British Army's Royal Corps of Signals (RCS). The regiment was formed following the formation of the TAVR in 1967, and was disbanded in 2009 following a reorganisation in the RCS. Though not disbanded, the regiment continues its lineage as a squadron, with its own former squadrons forming troops within said squadron.

== Formation ==
In 1967, a massive reorganisation of the British Army took place, whereas the Territorial Army (TA) and Army Emergency Reserve (AER) were merged and their strength more than halved. Within the Royal Corps of Signals (RCS), new signal regiments were formed with regional connections, and one of these new units was 36 (Eastern) Signal Regiment. The new regiment was formed following the amalgamation of several signal units based in the East of England; 44th (Home Counties), 45th (Essex), and 54th (East Anglian) Signal Regiments.

The new regiment's structure on formation was as follows:

- 36 (Eastern) Signal Regiment
  - Regimental Headquarters and Headquarters Squadron, in Wanstead
  - 44 (Cinque Ports) Signal Squadron, in Gillingham
    - Squadron Headquarters
    - 746 Control Centre Signal Troop
    - 747 Control Centre Signal Troop
    - 748 Control Centre Signal Troop
    - 818 Radio Relay Signal Troop
  - 45 (Essex) Signal Squadron, in Wanstead
    - Squadron Headquarters
    - 750 Control Centre Signal Troop, in Colchester
    - 751 Control Centre Signal Troop, in Brentwood
    - 752 Control Centre Signal Troop, in Ilford
    - 817 Radio Relay Signal Troop
  - 54 (East Anglian) Signal Squadron, in Cambridge
    - Squadron Headquarters
    - 753 Control Centre Signal Troop
    - 754 Control Centre Signal Troop, in Bedford
    - 755 Control Centre Signal Troop, in Norwich
    - 819 Radio Relay Signal Troop
  - 36 Signal Regiment Light Aid Detachment (LAD), Royal Electrical and Mechanical Engineers, in Newbury Park

The year the new regiment was formed, 12th Signal Group was formed up at Chelsea Barracks in London. 12 Group's task was to provide communications for logistics units in the Rear Combat Zone (RCZ) and Communications Zone (CommZ) British Army of the Rhine (BAOR). The specific task allotted to 36 Regiment was to provide the field communications for the logistics units in the Forward Maintenance Area (FMA), a sub area of the RCZ (the other being Rear Maintenance Area (RMA)), and to link Rear HQ 1 (BR) Corps into the Logistic Communications of the RCZ.

== Reorganisation ==
In 1970, the regiment's organisation was altered when 818 Signal Troop was reorganised into two new troops, each one co-located with 45 and 54 Signal Squadrons, these two new troops were deemed 'Brick troops'. In 1985, 45 Signal Squadron moved to Colchester, while 752 Signal Troop consolidated there, and 751 Signal Troop remained in Brentwood.

In 1992, HQ squadron moved to Ilford, and in December 44 Sqn moved to Grays, while maintaining two troops remained in Southend-on-Sea. That same year, the radio relay troops were disbanded as part of the Options for Change, in addition to the regiment leaving the recently disbanded 12 Signal Group, and joining the expanded 2nd (National Communications) Signal Brigade. The Regiment disbanded the Radio Relay troops, and reorganised to 4 Euromux Communications troops per squadron, so as an example 54 Signal Squadron in Cambridge became:

Squadron Headquarters, in Cambridge

- 754 Signal Troop, in Bedford
- 755 Signal Troop, in Norwich
- 756 Signal Troop, in Bedford
- 757 Signal Troop, in Cambridge

From 1987, the regiment was equipped with the EUROMUX signal system, and tasked with supporting the Allied Rapid Reaction Corps on mobilisation. By this time the regiment joined the 11th (Allied Rapid Reaction Corps) Signal Brigade, but was transferred to 12th Signal Group (V) by 2003.

== Disbandment ==
In 2006, the regiment was reorganised in-line with the Future Army Structure programme. Under this reorganisation, 44 Sqn was disbanded while helping to form the new RHQ, and the squadrons reorganised;

On disbandment in 2009 the Regiment comprised:

- Regimental Headquarters - Cambridge
- 45 (Close Support) Squadron
  - SHQ and A Troop - Colchester
  - B Troop - Ipswich
  - C Troop - Southend
- 54 (Support) Squadron
  - SHQ and Troop - Cambridge
- 60 (Royal Buckinghamshire Hussars) Signal Squadron
  - SHQ and A Troop - Aylesbury
  - B Troop and C Troop - Bedford

Under the Strategic Review of the Reserves in April, 2009 the Regiment was downsized to a squadron, and became the 36 (East Anglian) Signal Squadron, based at Colchester, under 37 Signal Regiment based at Redditch. 36 (East Anglian) Signal Squadron comprises:

- 844 Cinque Ports Signal Troop - Colchester
- 845 Essex Signal Signal Troop - Colchester
- 854 East Anglian Signal Troop - Cambridge

60 (Royal Buckinghamshire Hussars) Signal Squadron also downsized to 860 (Royal Buckinghamshire Hussars) Signal Troop and became part of the Berkshire Yeomanry, 94 Signal Squadron, under 39 (Skinners) Signal Regiment, at Bristol.

The former Regimental Headquarters (RHQ) at Ilford was redesignated as RHQ, 101st Engineer Regiment. Both 860 Signal Troop at Aylesbury and 854 Signal Troop at Cambridge were removed from the Army's order of battle in the SDSR changes at the end of 2013, and in April 2014 907 Signal troop at Chelmsford moved from 68 (Inns of Court & City Yeomanry) Signal Squadron to 36 Signal squadron, allowing the squadron to be renamed as 36 (Essex Yeomanry) Signal Squadron.

In 2009, as part of the reorganisation of the TA, wholesale mergers and disbandments took place throughout the Royal Corps of Signals. As part of the reorganisation, 36 Signal Regiment was reduced to 36 (Eastern) Signal Squadron, based in Colchester with 845 (Essex) Signal Troop in Colchester, 854 (East Anglian) Signal Troop in Cambridge, while 60 Sqn became a signal troop under 94 (Berkshire Yeomanry) Signal Squadron.

Under the Strategic Defence and Security Review in 2013, 907 (Essex Yeomanry) Signal Troop was subordinated to 36 Signal Squadron, which then became 36 (Essex Yeomanry) Signal Squadron, part of 71 (Yeomanry) Signal Regiment, though remained in Colchester. In addition, 854 Troop was transferred to the Intelligence Corps as 32 Military Intelligence Company.

== Honorary Colonels ==
Honorary Colonels of the regiment included:

- 1 April 1967 – 1 April 1974: Captain (Honorary Colonel) Sir Derek Burdick Greenaway, 2nd Baronet, TD, JP
- 1 April 1974 – 1 April 1979: Brigadier Peter Desmond Vaigncourt-Strallen
- 1 April 1979 – 20 July 1985: Colonel Geoffrey Seymour Hamilton Dicker, CBE, TD – former Honorary Colonel of 54 (East Anglian) Signal Regiment
- 20 July 1985–1 January 1990: Colonel Michael Howard Seys-Phillips, TD, DL
- 1 January 1990–1 May 2001: Colonel Alan Edmund Matticot Hall, TD, DL
- 1 May 2001–1 June 2006: Colonel Stephen P. Foakes, TD, DL – later Honorary Colonel of 71 Signal Regiment
- 1 June 2006–1 April 2010: Major General John Seumas Kerr, CBE

== Regimental links ==
The regiment maintained strong links with the Worshipful Company of Poulters of London, whom their annual award for the best soldier in the regiment was named for – the Poulters Plate.
