= 71st (City of London) Yeomanry Signal Regiment =

British Army military unit

- Active: 1969 – present
- Country: United Kingdom
- Branch: British Army
- Type: Combat Support
- Size: Regiment of appx. 381 personnel
- Part of: 7th Signal Group
- Regimental HQ: Bexleyheath, Kent

Insignia
- Tactical Recognition Flash

71st (City of London) Yeomanry Signal Regiment is an Army Reserve regiment in the Royal Corps of Signals in the British Army. The regiment forms part of 7th Signal Group, providing military communications for national operations.

== History ==
The regiment was formed as 71st (Yeomanry) Signal Regiment, Royal Signals in 1969. The squadrons at that time included HQ (London and Kent) Squadron, 70 (Essex Yeomanry) Signal Squadron, 94 (Berkshire Yeomanry) Signal Squadron and 68 (Inns of Court & City Yeomanry) Signal Squadron. HQ Squadron converted to a communications role and was re-designated 265 (Kent and County of London Yeomanry) Squadron in 1970.

In 2006, 47 (Middlesex Yeomanry) Signal Squadron transferred from 39th Signal Regiment (The Skinners).

In 2014, under Army 2020, 36th (Eastern) Signal Regiment reformed as 36 (Essex Yeomanry) Signal Squadron and transferred from 37th Signal Regiment. Also in 2014, under Army 2020, 47 (Middlesex Yeomanry) Signal Squadron (already part of the regiment) amalgamated with 41 (Princess Louise's Kensington) Signal Squadron (previously part of 38th (City of Sheffield) Signal Regiment) to form a new entity, 31 (Middlesex Yeomanry and Princess Louise's Kensington) Signal Squadron.

== Structure ==
The regiment's current structure is as follows:

- Regimental Headquarters, in Bexleyheath
- 31 (Middlesex Yeomanry and Princess Louise's Kensington) Signal Squadron, in Uxbridge
  - 841 (Princess Louise's Kensington) Signal Troop, in Coulsdon
- 36 (Essex Yeomanry) Signal Squadron, in Colchester
  - 845 (East Anglian) Signal Troop, in Chelmsford
- 68 (Inns of Court & City Yeomanry) Signal Squadron, in Whipps Cross
  - 847 (London) Signal Troop, in White City, London
- 265 (Kent and County of London Yeomanry (Sharpshooters)) Support Squadron, in Bexleyheath

== See also ==
- Units of the Royal Corps of Signals
