= Hilsea Barracks =

- Hilsea, Portsmouth
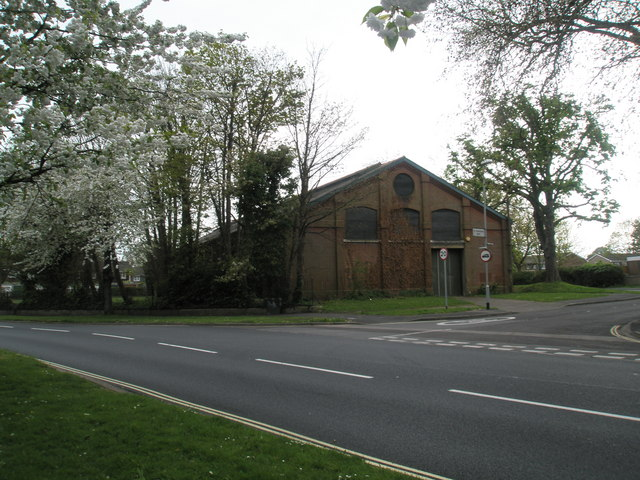
- Former military riding school within Gatcombe Park

Site information
- Type: Barracks
- Owner: Ministry of Defence
- Operator: British Army

Location
- Location within Hampshire
- Coordinates: 50.82838°N 1.06682°W

Site history
- Built: 1780
- Built for: War Office
- In use: 1780-1965

Hilsea Barracks was a military installation at Hilsea in Portsmouth.

== History ==
The site was originally occupied by Gatcombe Manor, a medieval house which was acquired through marriage by Admiral Sir Roger Curtis, Bt in the 18th century. The War Office requisitioned the land from Curtis for military purposes in the 1770s. (Gatcombe House, which was rebuilt in 1780, was subsequently occupied by Sir Roger's son, Sir Lucius. He had vacated it by 1849; it was subsequently used as part of the barracks and survives as a Grade II listed building.)

=== The first barracks ===
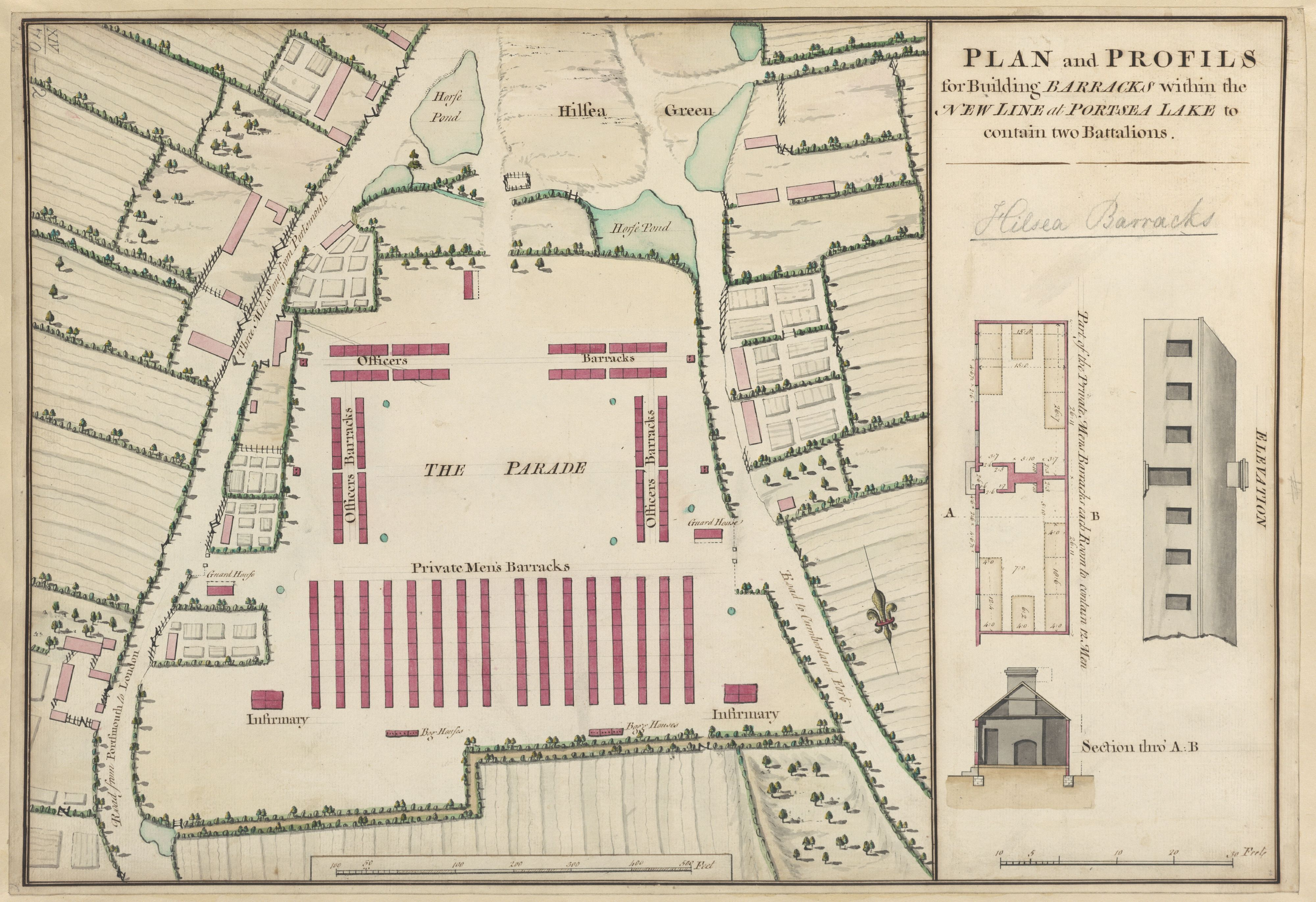
Plan and illustration of the barracks in the 18th century.

A plan for barracks on the site was first drawn up by William Dundas in 1756, in connection with the construction of Hilsea Lines (designed to protect Portsmouth and its Dockyard from landward attack). Building commenced in 1780; as designed, the barracks consisted of rows of long wooden huts arranged around three sides of a parade ground. In 1794 the barracks were extended, so as to accommodate several thousand troops. In 1801 they were described as 'very extensive' and were being used 'for accommodating a great number of men, who are generally sent there previously to embarking on foreign service, and also on their return. These barracks may, therefore, be considered as a grand military depôt for having men in readiness on any sudden emergency'.

Following the Napoleonic Wars the barracks were gradually dismantled, the last part being taken down (and the materials sold) in February 1822. Only the associated hospital was retained.

=== Artillery barracks ===
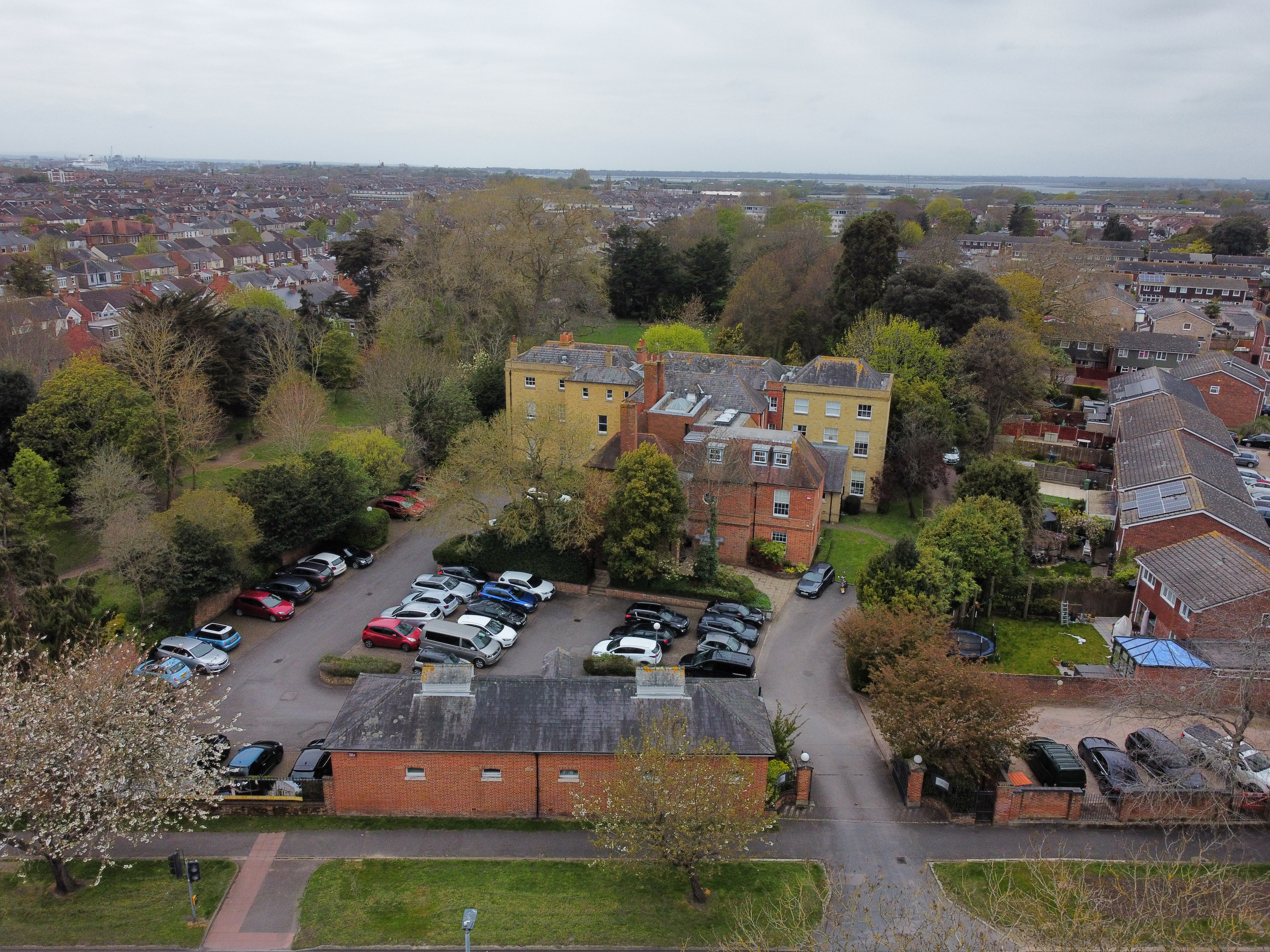
Gatcombe House, which served as the officers' mess.

In 1854 Hilsea Barracks were rebuilt, on a more permanent basis, for occupation by the Royal Field Artillery; accommodation was provided for 100 men and 100 artillery horses, (more was added subsequently). By 1864 two batteries of the Royal Artillery were stationed there. The men were accommodated in brick huts measuring 60 ft (18 m) by 20 ft (6.1 m), 22 men to a hut. Accommodation for the officers was provided in Gatcombe House. A new pavilion plan hospital was built in 1865. A military chapel known as "St Barbara's Garrison Church" was added in 1888.

=== HQ Royal Army Ordnance Corps ===
The Royal Field Artillery vacated the site in 1921, whereupon it became the main headquarters and training depot for the Royal Army Ordnance Corps, with Gatcombe House serving as the Headquarters Officers' Mess. During the Second World War the site was used by the United States Army. The RAOC moved their regimental depot to Feltham Barracks in 1946 and vacated the site entirely on 31 March 1962.

The buildings, which had undergone various improvements and changes of use over the years, were demolished to make way for the "Gatcombe Park" housing development in 1965. The Victorian riding school, built for the Royal Artillery in the 1890s and some of the walls which enclosed the barracks still survive.

== Sources ==
- Mitchell, Garry (1988). Hilsea Lines and Portsbridge. ISBN 0-947605-06-1.
