= Fenwick2 Health and Wellbeing Centre =

Fenwick2 Health and Wellbeing Centre was a community health and well-being centre at Pike's Hill, Lyndhurst, Hampshire, England. Fenwick2 was formerly known as the Fenwick Cottage Hospital.

== History ==
The former Fenwick hospital was built by businessman and benefactor George Fenwick in 1908 as a gift to the people of Lyndhurst. George Fenwick owned Allum Green House, which was located nearby in Lyndhurst. A plaque on the wall of the Fenwick2 building reads that George Fenwick constructed the hospital "to the Glory of God and for the suffering poor of Lyndhurst and neighbourhood".

The hospital operated under the name Fenwick Cottage Hospital for nearly 100 years. In 2005, Hampshire Primary Care Trust held consultation meetings to decide its future. 2000 protestors attended a rally in Lyndhurst and 40,000 people signed a petition in support of keeping the hospital open.

The hospital was re-opened as the Fenwick2 Health and Well-being Centre in April 2008. Hampshire Primary Care Trust donated the hospital buildings to Southampton-based social enterprise SCA Group and the Fenwick League of Friends and the centre was refurbished with a £750,000 grant from the Department of Health.

== Fenwick2 today ==
Until 2022, Fenwick2 functioned as a social enterprise community centre offering a range of health and social care services. It had a gym, meeting rooms, a multi-agency early dementia assessment project, a social club for isolated elderly people, an assisted bathing service, a nail-cutting service, a carers' resource centre, a dementia respite service and a wide range of alternative therapies. An NHS long-term conditions centre was also located on the site, with patient support groups.

Other not-for-profit services were also based at Fenwick2, including the SCA Institute of Social Enterprise, the SCA Domiciliary Care Services, and Wessex Care Decisions advice service and the New Forest branch of Carers Together Hampshire.

In July 2009, a plaque was unveiled to George Fenwick at Fenwick2 by his great grandson, Patrick Cumberlege. Cumberlege's wife, Baroness Julia Cumberlege, also visited Fenwick2 in November 2009.
