= SCA Group =

- Formation: 1991; 35 years ago
- Founder: Brian Strevens
- Type: Social Enterprise
- Purpose: To provide homecare and daycare services
- Headquarters: Southampton
- Region served: South coast of England
- Website: SCA Group Website

SCA Group (Social Care in Action) is a social enterprise health and social care organisation based in Southampton, Hampshire, England. It operates in the south coast region of England.

SCA Group started as SCA Community Care Services (now SCA Care) to provide homecare and daycare services. It was established in 1991 on a not-for-profit basis by Brian Strevens, former Director of Southampton Council for Voluntary Services.

== Projects ==
SCA Group has established several centres and groups that provide services to Southampton residents:

- SCA Support Services (now SCA Transport) provides accessible transport services.
- The Quinn Centre provides National Vocational Qualifications and other training courses for carers.
- SCA Trafalgar Dental Services has seven dental practices providing access to NHS dentistry to residents of Hampshire and Dorset.
- SCA Group established the Fenwick2 Health and Wellbeing Centre after acquiring the former Fenwick Cottage Hospital buildings. Hampshire Primary Care Trust donated the hospital buildings to SCA Group and Fenwick2 is now run by SCA Group and the Fenwick League of Friends.
- The group's Institute of Social Enterprise is based at the Fenwick2 Health and Well-being Centre.
