= Somerville Logistic Reorganisation Committee Report =

The Somerville Logistic Committee was established by General Sir William Jackson the then Quarter Master General (QMG) in 1974 to consider the re-structuring of the MOD (Army) Q Staffs and logistic services. It was chaired by Major General RM Somerville the then Vice Quarter Master General (VQMG). It reported in March 1975.

Its principal recommendations were that a new logistic staff structure, the Logistic Executive (Army) (LE(A)), was to be set up and absorb the RAOC's HQ Base Organisation and REME's Support Group, as well as the staff of Deputy Quarter Master General (DQMG). There would however be no change in logistic corps structure; this was to come later with the implementation of the Logistic Support Review (LSR) in 1993. LE(A) was to be set up outside London; Andover was eventually selected.

The major change in staff working was the amalgamation of the Directorate of Equipment Management with Royal Engineers (RE), Royal Corps of Transport (RCT), Royal Army Ordnance Corps (RAOC) and Royal Electrical and Mechanical Engineers (REME) staff branches. For the first time a single point of contact would lead on an individual item or range of equipment. This produced much needed simplification. The main drawback was that the equipment inventory was divided somewhat arbitrarily. RE (Engineer Services) took over control of equipment, principally plant, operated solely by that corps. RCT took on railway and maritime (including port) equipment. The RAOC assumed responsibility for ranges not normally subject to base repair (principally non-armoured vehicles, small arms and clothing and general stores) and the REME the base repair range (principally armoured vehicles, larger weapon systems and communications and electronic equipment).

The other major change was a large scale exodus from London to the former RAF Maintenance Command site at Andover in Hampshire.

This rationalisation was designed to achieve cost savings of 20% and undoubtedly simplified staff procedures.
