= MOD Feltham =

- Feltham, Middlesex in England
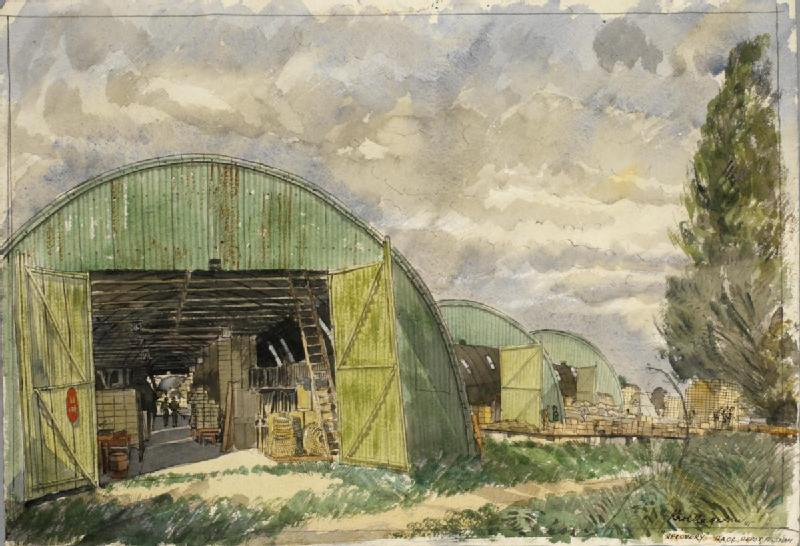
- Recovery Stores at a RAOC Depot, Feltham by Karl Hagedorn, 1945

Site information
- Type: Barracks
- Owner: Ministry of Defence
- Operator: British Army

Location
- Shown within Greater London
- Coordinates: 51.4416°N 0.4091°W

Site history
- Built: 1917
- Built for: War Office
- In use: 1917–2026

MOD Feltham (formerly Feltham Barracks) is a secure 30-acre (12 ha) former military installation in Feltham, Middlesex.

== History ==
This land was first acquired by the War Department during the First World War; by 1917 it was serving as an Air Acceptance Park with an aerodrome attached. After the war, in 1922, the Royal Army Service Corps (RASC) took over the site and buildings to serve as its Mechanical Transport Depot.

The following year Feltham House, on the northern edge of the site, was purchased to serve as an officers' mess. (Believed to have been built in the 1770s for the Villebois family, the house (then known as Feltham Place) passed through several owners, serving for a time as a boys' school before being bought by 'Cabbage King' Alfred Smith in 1897.) It is a Grade II listed building with interiors designed or influenced by James Wyatt. It continued in use as an officers' mess through the 20th century (and was extended in the 1960s); however, as of 2018, it is unoccupied and has been placed on the Heritage at Risk Register.

By the 1930s barrack blocks were laid out in rows to the south of Feltham House, while large industrial-type sheds to the east and further south were served by a set of tramlines linked to the mainline railway. The easternmost part of the site was (and remains) in use as playing fields. By the time of the Second World War the site was designated No. 1 Vehicle Reserve Depot; it also housed the RASC's Mechanical Transport Stores Depot and Mechanical Transport Heavy Repair Shop, as well as the RASC Driving School.

Feltham continued to serve as a Central Vehicle Depot (CVD) and Central Ordnance Depot (COD) of the Royal Army Ordnance Corps after the war (the RAOC having taken over responsibility for vehicle storage from the RASC in 1942). In 1962 part of the site was taken over by military intelligence as a facility specialising in the gathering and analysis of cartographic data. The closure of CVD Feltham was announced in 1969 and in 1970 COD Feltham was redesignated as an Ordnance Support Unit (OSU). In the 1970s the tramways were removed and a sizeable area to the south of the site was sold for redevelopment. OSU Feltham closed in 1996.

== Future ==
In the 21st century the site remained in use as the Defence Geographic Centre (DGC) 'its primary role [being] to provide land maps, aeronautical charts, positional information, geo-referenced imagery and digital data in [various] formats for UK defence planning, operations and training'. The Defence HUMINT Organisation (DHO) was also based at Feltham. In 2012 DGC had a (largely civilian) staff of 400; its library included a global collection of over 700,000 maps, charts and atlases. DHO had 350 personnel, drawn from across the three services.

In 2016 MOD Feltham was earmarked for disposal by the MOD, with an expected closure date of 2023. This was later extended to 2026.
