= Royal Army Ordnance Corps =

Former corps of the British Army (1918–1993)

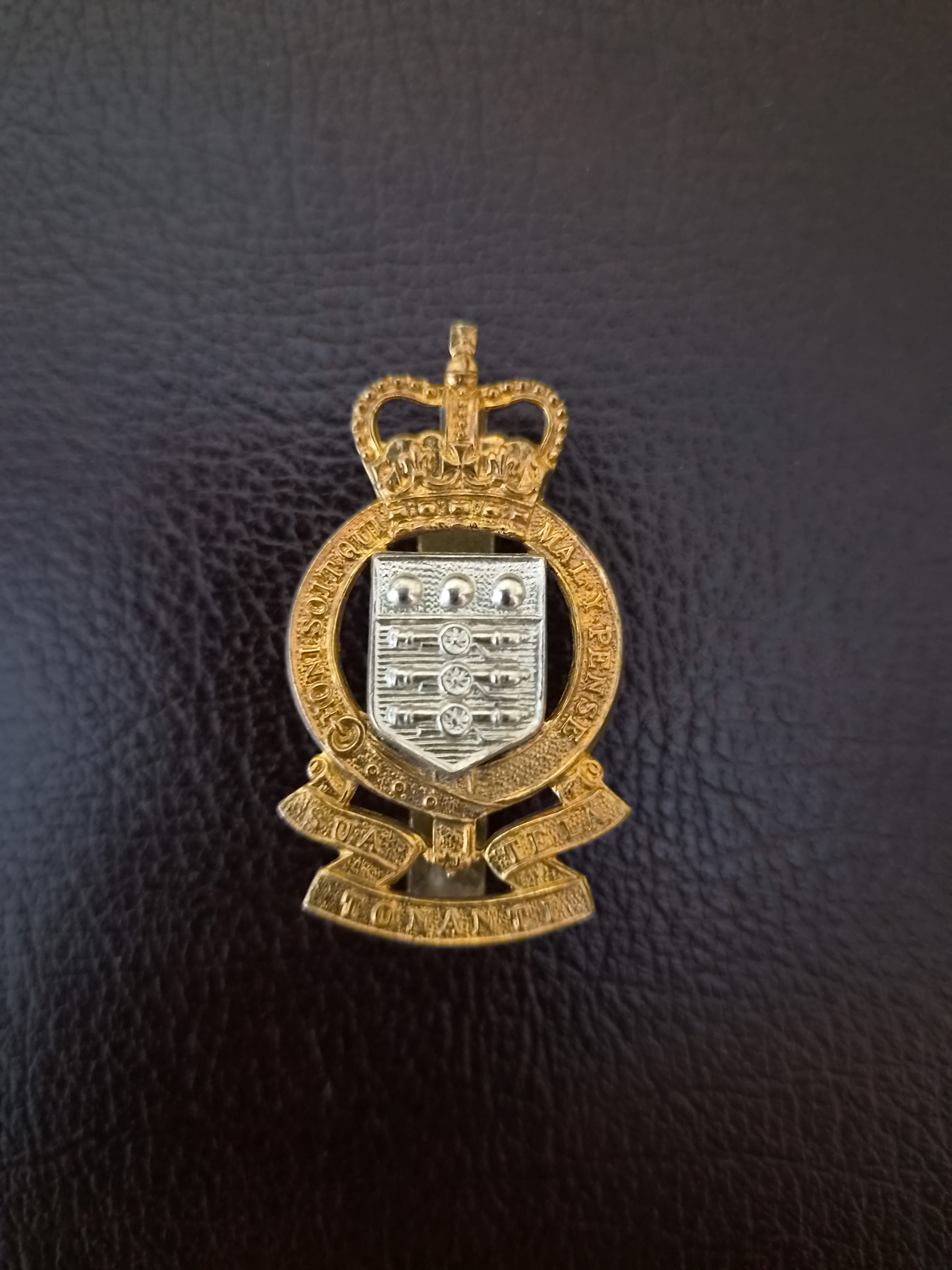
- Royal Army Ordnance Corps Cap badge
- Active: 1918 – 1993
- Allegiance: United Kingdom
- Branch: British Army
- Role: Storage and issuing of ordnance
- Garrison/HQ: Woolwich Arsenal
- Mottos: Sua tela tonanti (literally "His [i.e. Jupiter's] Missiles to the one who is Thundering", but commonly translated as "To the Warrior his Arms")
- March: The Village Blacksmith

Insignia
- Tactical Recognition Flash

The Royal Army Ordnance Corps (RAOC) was a corps of the British Army. At its renaming as a Royal Corps in 1918 it was both a supply and repair corps. In the supply area it had responsibility for weapons, armoured vehicles and other military equipment, ammunition and clothing and certain minor functions such as laundry, mobile baths and photography. The RAOC was also responsible for a major element of the repair of Army equipment. In 1942 the latter function was transferred to the Royal Electrical and Mechanical Engineers (REME) and the vehicle storage and spares responsibilities of the Royal Army Service Corps were in turn passed over to the RAOC. The RAOC retained repair responsibilities for ammunition, clothing and certain ranges of general stores. In 1964 the McLeod Reorganisation of Army Logistics resulted in the RAOC absorbing petroleum, rations and accommodation stores functions from the Royal Army Service Corps as well as the Army Fire Service, barrack services, sponsorship of NAAFI (EFI) and the management of staff clerks from the same Corps. On 5 April 1993, the RAOC was one of the corps that amalgamated to form The Royal Logistic Corps (RLC).

The permanent establishment of an Ordnance Office long predated that of a standing army in Britain; it has therefore been claimed that 'in a wide sense, as heirs to the master-bowyers, master-fletchers, master-carpenters and master-smiths who, in mediaeval days, were responsible as Officers of Ordnance for the care and provision of warlike matériel, and to their successors the storekeepers, clerks, artificers, armourers and storemen of the Board of Ordnance, the R.A.O.C. can claim a far longer continuous history and more ancient lineage than any other unit of the British Army'.

== Predecessors of the RAOC ==
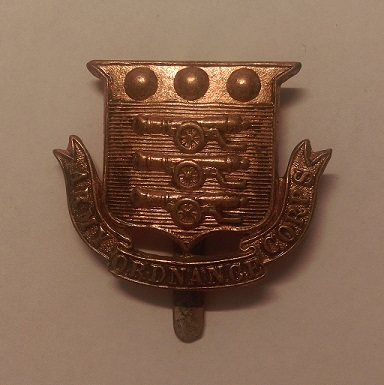
Army Ordnance Corps Cap Badge (pre-First World War)

Supply and repair of technical equipment, principally artillery and small arms, was the responsibility of the Master General of the Ordnance and the Board of Ordnance from the Middle Ages until they lost their independence in 1855. Thereafter followed thirty years of fluctuating allocation of responsibilities and a great variety of titles of both corps and individuals. This complex, convoluted and largely unsatisfactory period insofar as Army logistics was concerned was summarised in 1889 as follows:

'The English Ordnance Department goes back into an older history than the Army. There were Master Generals of the Ordnance and Boards of Ordnance centuries before there were Secretaries of State for War or Commanders-in-Chief. Begun under the Tudors the Board of Ordnance lived through the changes of the Great Rebellion, the Commonwealth, the Restoration and the Revolution until it fell, at last, in the panic that followed in the disasters of the Crimean War. ...the many alterations in administration that followed the abolition of the Board of Ordnance, through the last 30 years, can only be read as a negative evidence in favour of the organisation, and as positive proof that the machinery of effective Army Store administration has yet to be evolved from its ruins.'

=== Before Crimea ===
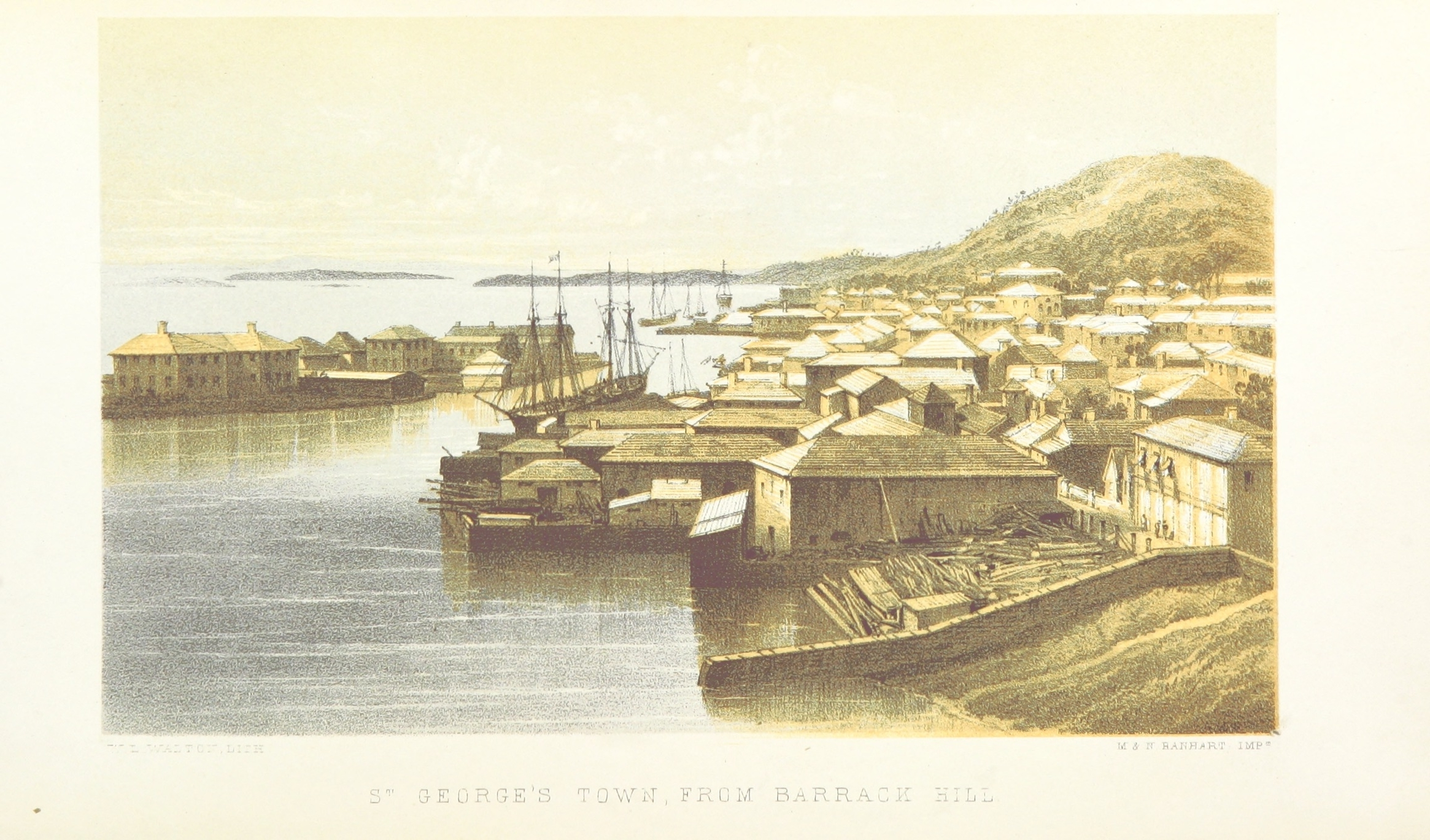
St. George's Town in the Imperial fortress colony of Bermuda, seen from Barrack Hill, in 1857, with Ordnance Island at left, used by the Ordnance Stores Department and its successors since the American War of 1812

The Board of Ordnance had its own military establishment consisting of the Royal Artillery and the Royal Engineers (who were not at that time part of the British Army). The Storekeeper's department, on the other hand, was part of the civil establishment, though (as with much of the Board's activity) troops were involved in various aspects of its operation when not deployed elsewhere. In any case, modern distinctions between civilian and military personnel were not so clear cut for those serving under the Board: its officers, engineers and artillerymen received their commissions or patents from the Master-General of the Ordnance, as did the Storekeepers, artificers and storemen. Though civilians, the Storekeepers were provided with uniform, akin to that of the Royal Artillery, described in 1833 as a blue coat with red stand-collar and cuffs, gold epaulettes indicating rank and blue trousers with a gold stripe, worn with a gold-hilted sword and a cocked hat; Clerks on the establishment wore the same uniform but without epaulettes. After Waterloo they were given relative rank (for the purpose of allotting appropriate quarters): Storekeepers to rank as lieutenant colonel, Deputy Storekeepers as major (if in independent charge) or else captain, Assistant Storekeepers as lieutenant and Clerks as a non-commissioned officer. The Storekeepers and their Deputies had oversight of the Ordnance Yards, both at home and abroad, however they were never deployed in the theatre of war.

==== Field Train Department of the Board of Ordnance ====
By the mid-eighteenth century, Woolwich Warren (the future Royal Arsenal) had outgrown the Tower of London as the main ordnance storage depot in the realm. In times of war, the Board of Ordnance Storekeepers found themselves responsible for conveying guns, ammunition and certain other items to the troops in the field (whereas provision of food, supplies and other equipment was largely dependent on the Commissariat, a department of HM Treasury). Until 1792, the transport and issue of weapons and ammunition to troops in the theatre of war was achieved by the formation of artillery trains, as and where required. In that year, with Britain about to engage in the French Revolutionary Wars, the Board sought to place this ad hoc arrangement on a permanent footing by establishing a Field Train Department. A Lieutenant-General of the Royal Artillery served as its Commandant and a Major-General as his Deputy, but otherwise its personnel were uniformed civilians: under a Senior Commissary based at Woolwich were Commissaries, Assistant Commissaries, Clerks of Stores and Conductors of Stores (equivalent to Majors, Captains, subalterns and NCOs respectively). In peace time nothing more than a small cadre of officers was maintained (at the headquarters in Woolwich), but in time of war they were supplemented by recruits from the Ordnance Storekeeper's department to serve in the field; thus the strength of the Department varied dramatically, from 4 or 5 (during the peaceful years 1828-1853) to 346 at its peak in 1813. Each recruit received special training in the handling of munitions. During the Crimean War a number of Sergeants were seconded from the Royal Artillery to serve as Military Conductors in addition to the civilian staff.

With regard to the Royal Artillery and the Royal Engineers, the Field Train Department had additional responsibilities: it provided them with pay, clothing, medical supplies and camp equipment when deployed (while the Commissariat provided their food and forage). The Field Train Department provided the Royal Engineers with their pontoon bridges and other specialist equipment, and (until the formation of a separate Corps of Artillery Drivers) provided for the movement of artillery pieces in the field (other than those pertaining to the Royal Horse Artillery). For the duration of conflict the Department's personnel accompanied the Artillery and Engineer units in the field providing them with logistic support (including repair facilities).

Between 1795 and 1815, the Field Train served in thirty expeditions and campaigns. In peacetime, the civilians and sergeants returned to their former duties, but the cadre of officers was retained; they were based initially in the Royal Arsenal, and then in the Grand Depot (just off Woolwich Common) where the guns were stored ready for deployment. At the start of the Crimean War, the Ordnance Field Train was mobilized once again. A parallel supply corps within the Army (the Royal Waggon Train, first established in 1794) had been disbanded as a cost-cutting measure in 1833, however, and its responsibilities devolved again to the Commissariat (which was by now more attuned to peacetime operations than warfare); after a well-publicised series of logistical failings the Commissariat and the Board of Ordnance, as well as the command-structure of the army itself, were all strongly criticised, leading (among other things) to the abolition of the Board (in 1855) and its Field Train Department (in 1859, its officers having transferred to the new Military Store Department).

=== After Crimea ===
In the years following the Crimean War three corps can be identified as the direct predecessors of the RAOC. The Military Store Department (MSD) created in 1861 granted military commissions and provided officers to manage stores inventories. In parallel a subordinate corps of warrant officers and sergeants, the Military Store Clerks Corps (MSC), was also created to carry out clerical duties. These small corps (235 officers in the MSD and 44 MSC) were based largely at the Tower of London, Woolwich Arsenal and Weedon Bec, but were also deployable on active service. They were supplemented in 1865 by the establishment at Woolwich of a Military Store Staff Corps (MSSC) to provide soldiers: initially 200-strong, it had more than doubled in size by 1869, with units in Portsmouth, Devonport, Aldershot, Dublin and Chatham as well as at Woolwich and the Tower.

In 1870 a further reorganisation, ostensibly to simplify management, resulted in the MSD, MSC and MSSC being grouped with the Army Service Corps (ASC) under the Control Department. The officers remained a separate branch (Ordnance or Military Stores) in the Control Department but the soldiers were absorbed into the ASC. This arrangement lasted until 1876.

The Control Department was disbanded in 1876. The Ordnance/Military Store officers joined a newly created Ordnance Stores Department (OSD). Five years later, in 1881, the soldiers also left the ASC and became the Ordnance Store Corps (OSC). In 1894 there were further changes. The OSD was retitled the Army Ordnance Department (AOD) and absorbed the Inspectors of Machinery from the Royal Artillery (RA). In parallel the OSC was retitled the Army Ordnance Corps (AOC) and at the same time absorbed the Corps of Armourers and the RA's Armament Artificers.

In 1918 the AOD was amalgamated into the Royal Army Ordnance Corps, and for the first time officers and soldiers served in the same organisation; the Corps received the "Royal" prefix in 1922 in recognition of its service during the First World War.

== Ordnance Services Organisation before 1914 ==
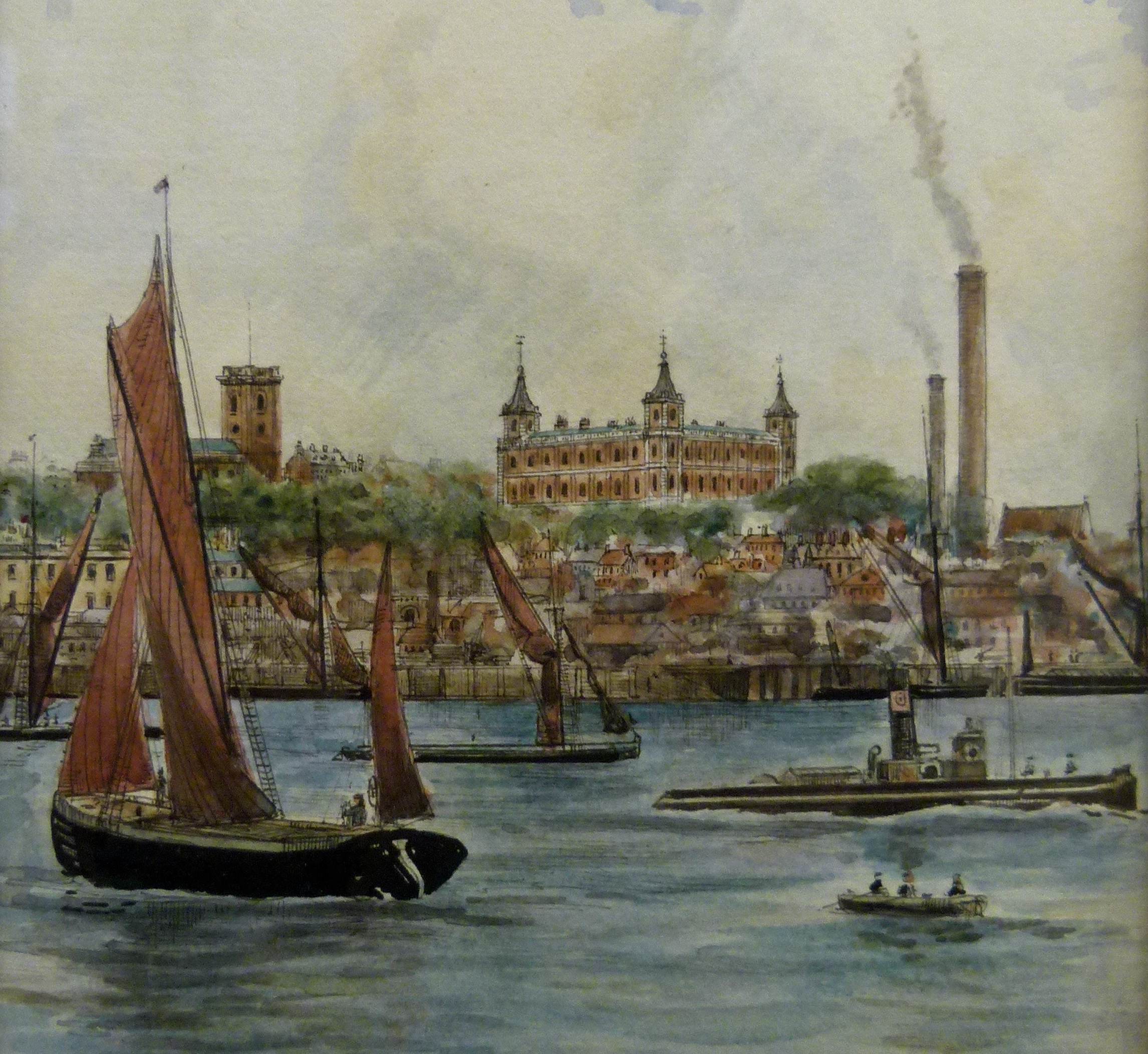
Red Barracks, Woolwich

=== Depots and other installations ===
The earliest depot for military stores was the Tower of London, headquarters of the Ordnance Office, which for many centuries sufficed to hold the country's central stocks of artillery, gunpowder, small arms and ammunition albeit in unsatisfactory circumstances. The Tower continued to be used for storage into the 19th century, but in 1671 the Board of Ordnance acquired a parcel of land at Woolwich which soon supplanted the Tower to become the Board's main ordnance storage depot; manufacture as well as storage of guns and ammunition took place on the site, which was later named the Royal Arsenal. In 1760 the Royal Gunpowder Magazine was established at Purfleet, replacing the Tower as Britain's central repository of gunpowder. In 1808 a modern purpose-built depot was constructed at Weedon, alongside the Grand Union Canal, to serve as a safe repository for guns and ammunition; and in 1813 a new Grand Storehouse was opened in the Royal Arsenal, containing multiple warehouses for all kinds of military stores. When Woolwich Dockyard closed in 1869, the entire dockyard site was taken over by the War Office to become a vast ordnance stores complex, annexed (and linked by rail) to the ordnance stores in the Royal Arsenal; large stocks of barrack stores, harnesses, accoutrements and other general stores were transferred to Woolwich Dockyard from the Tower at this time. At the same time the Military Store Department moved its headquarters from the Tower to the Red Barracks at Woolwich. The barracks went on to serve as the regimental depot, headquarters and home of the ordnance corps for the next fifty years. Finally, by about 1887, large stocks of small arms were moved from the Tower of London to Weedon, leaving the Tower to serve as a repository of ancient arms and armour and as a small Ordnance centre for troops in London.

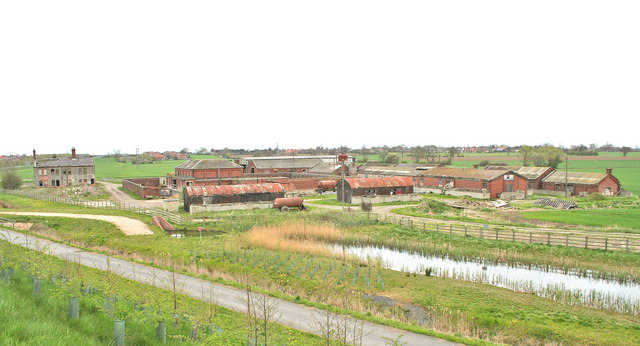
The former Barlby Ordnance Depot, dating from 1889 (one of a number of small depots established at that time).

In addition to these central depots, ordnance yards in the naval and garrison towns of Chatham, Portsmouth and Plymouth held reserve stocks of camp equipment, entrenching tools, small-arms and ammunition, accoutrements, harness and saddlery (similar stores were also provided at Dublin, Gibraltar and Malta). During the Crimean War, however, these arrangements proved unequal to the task of equipping an army with speed at a time of mobilization. After the war an Ordnance station was established as part of the new training camp at Aldershot: a hutted encampment was provided for troops to practise combined training, alongside a depot to furnish them with field stores. In the 1880s an effort was made to decentralise the reserves of equipment; as many as sixty-two small regional centres were set up, in an effort to bring stores closer to the units that would use them. Later, with the establishment of larger camps and garrisons in the early 20th century, these were consolidated into eighteen larger Ordnance stations. At the same time, during the period from the 1860s to 1914, various depots were established to support the Army throughout the world (with the notable exception of India where the Indian Army managed its own parallel organisation in Ordnance Depot Quetta, Rawalpindi and Karachi (then British India and now Pakistan), the Indian Army Ordnance Corps (IAOC). In 1881 there were detachments in Dublin, Jersey, Gibraltar, Malta, Bermuda, Canada, St Helena, Cape of Good Hope, Mauritius and Straits Settlements. There was also a substantial detachment supporting the Anglo-Zulu War in Natal.

In 1895 the Royal Army Clothing Department, with its factory and depot at Pimlico, was taken over by the AOD which then became responsible for the provision of uniforms and other items of clothing for much of the army.

=== Field units ===
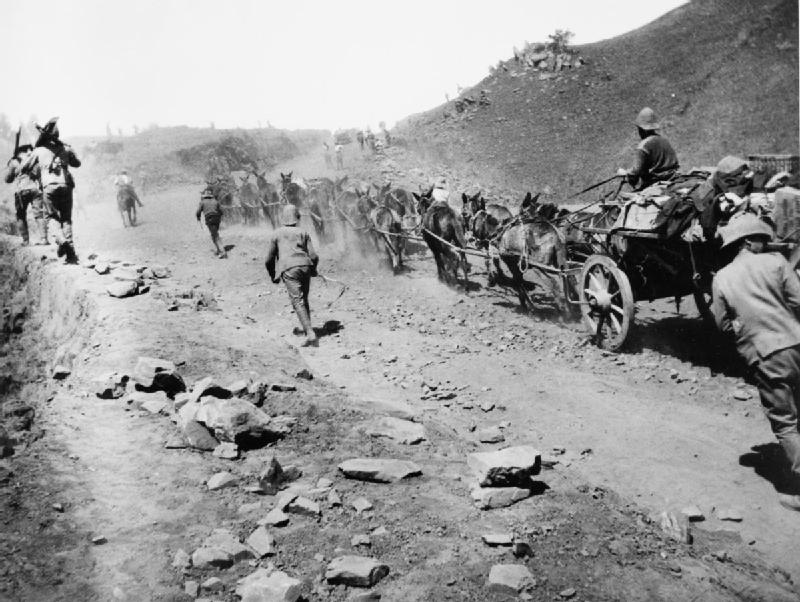
British Army logistics in the Boer War: mule train, 1899.

In 1855 Captain Henry Gordon (brother of the famous Gordon of Khartoum) left the Army and joined the Ordnance department; From March that year until July 1856 he was sent to Balaklava to take charge of all stores for all branches of the army: the first time an Ordnance Storekeeper had been appointed in the field of battle. The following year, a memorandum was issued making it clear that, in future, a staff of Military Store officers, clerks, artificers and labourers should accompany troops at time of war to ensure abundant provision of equipment for immediate use together with effective maintenance of reserve stocks in the field. These arrangements were put into practice both in China and in New Zealand in 1860. The labourers and artificers were civilians, until the establishment of the Military Store Staff Corps in 1865.

There was substantial support by the RAOC's predecessors for every late Victorian expedition with the major efforts being the campaigns in Egypt and the Sudan (1882-5 and 1898) and the Boer War (1899-1902). All campaigns required the support of very large numbers of troops, animals and equipment in hostile environments. They produced a well-developed system of stores dumps and repair facilities along extended lines of communication.

== First World War ==
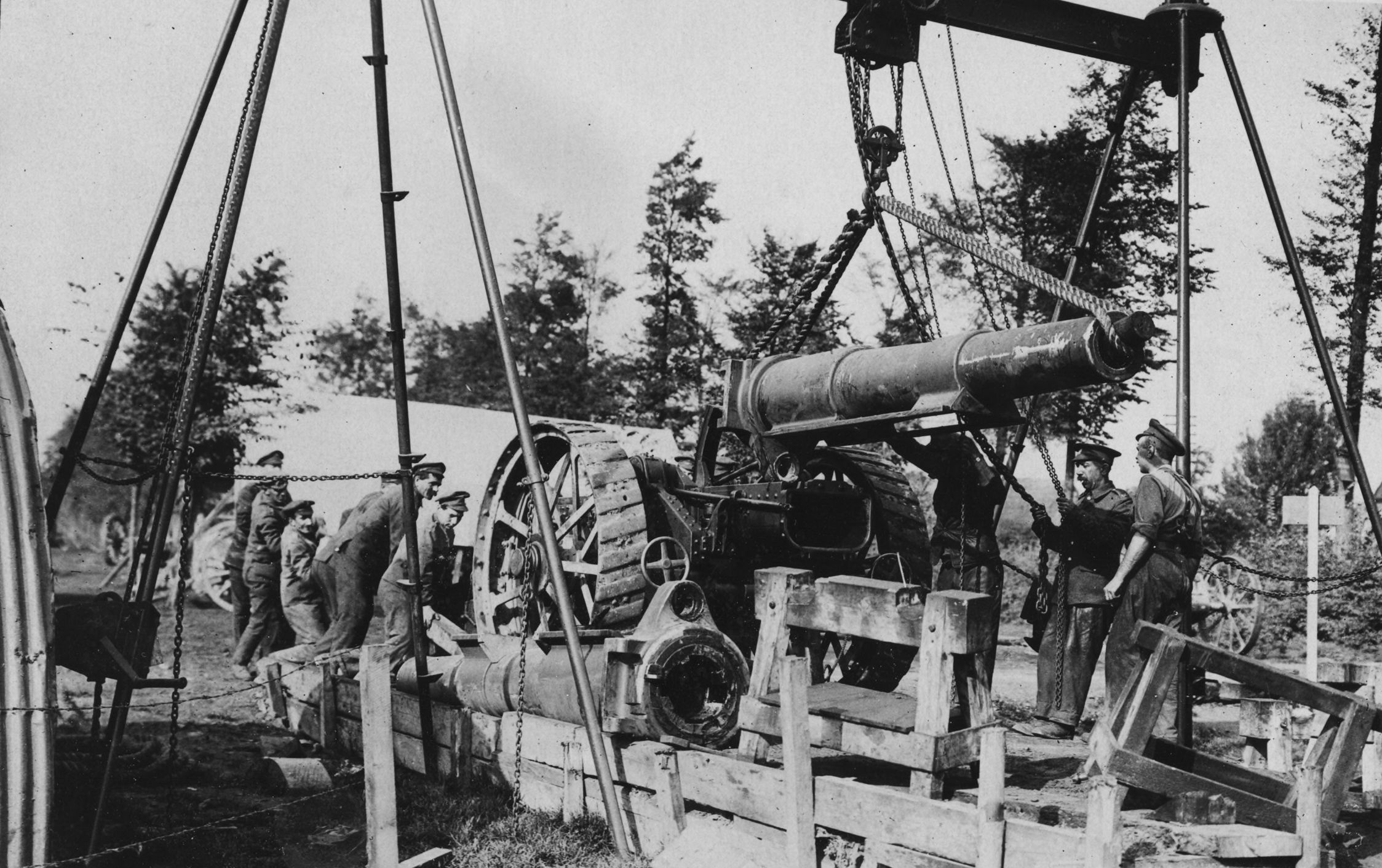
Soldiers of the AOC repairing an 8-inch howitzer at Passchendaele, 1917.

As with the rest of the British Army the AOD/AOC was transformed by the First World War. Both the sheer scale of the war and the increasing technical complexity created an organisational structure that, in its outlines, survives until today. The depots at Woolwich, Weedon and Pimlico were supplemented by the wholesale takeover of warehouses throughout the country and in early 1915 a depot was established at Didcot to be the major focus for the receipt and distribution of RAOC stores. Ammunition storage was also expanded dramatically and the former peacetime magazines at places such as Purfleet, Portsmouth and Plymouth were supplemented by purpose built depots at Bramley, Altrincham, Credenhill and Didcot.

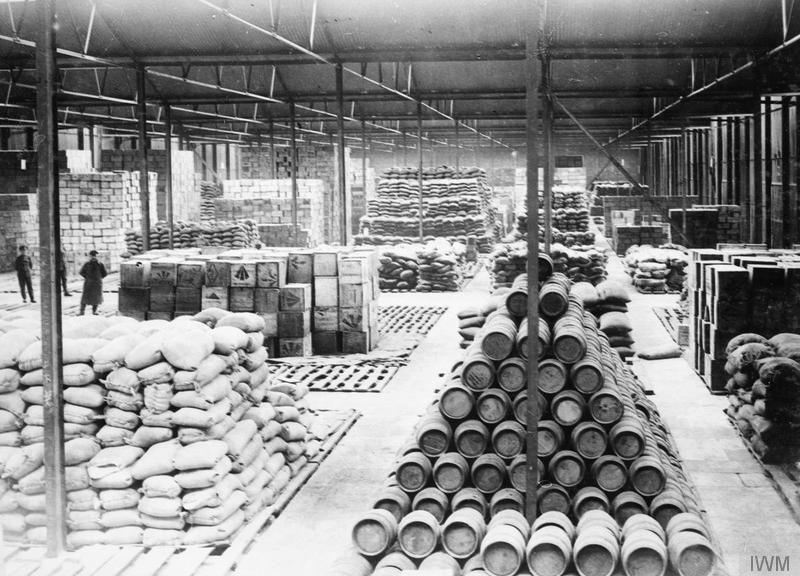
Inside a Base Supply Depot at Vendroux, 1917.

On the Western Front a highly successful logistic infrastructure, largely rail based, was created to support the front. Parallel systems, but of less complexity, supported operations in Italy. Other expeditions such as Gallipoli, Salonika, Palestine and Mesopotamia brought supply challenges and a large logistic bases were established on the Egyptian Canal Zone and Basra.

== 1920–1945 ==
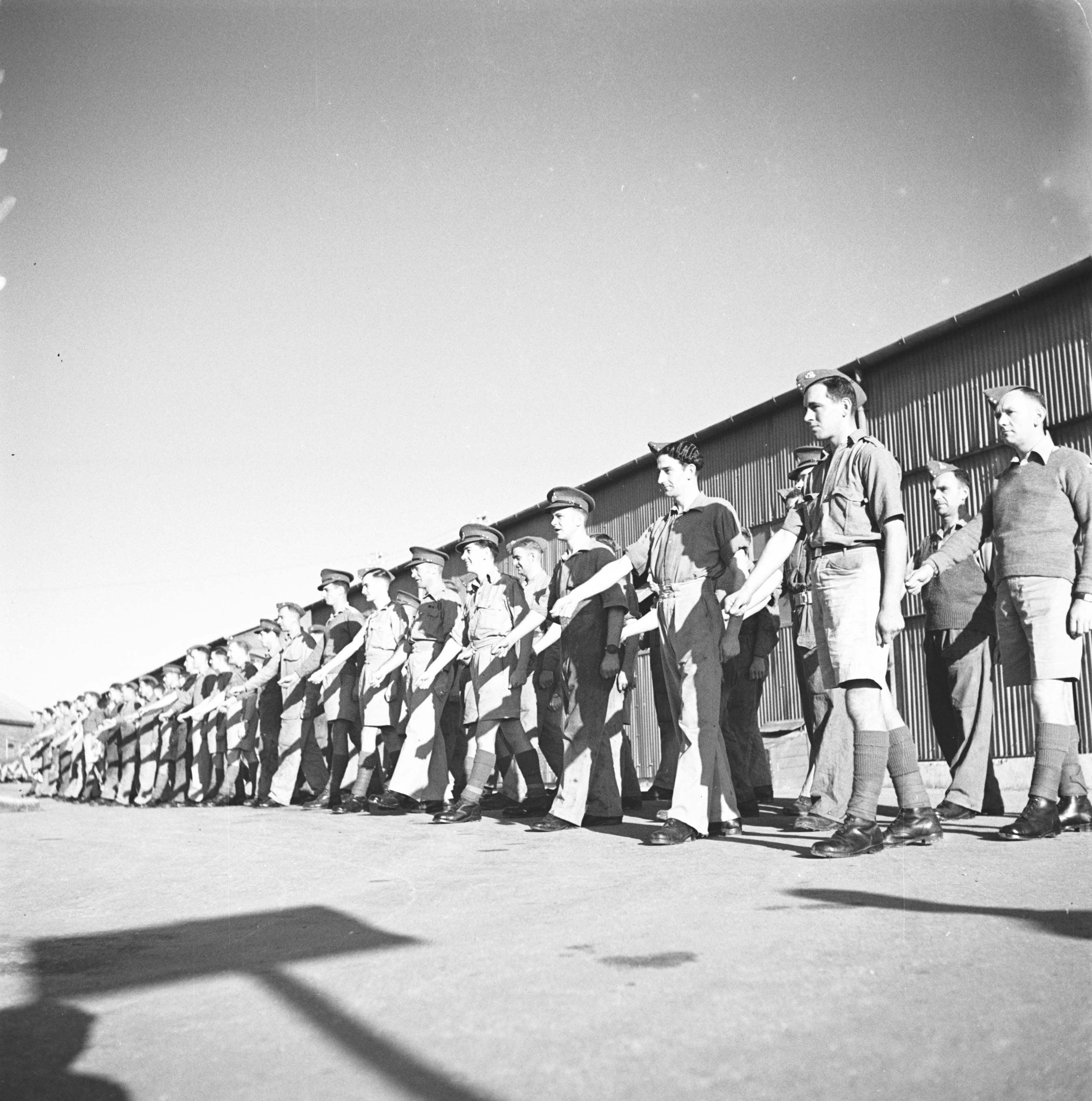
RAOC station in Palestine, 1941.

After the war there was considerable retrenchment. In the 1920s the RAOC's principal depots were Bramley (ammunition), Chilwell (general and surplus stores), Hereford (ammunition), Pimlico (clothing), Woolwich (gun stores and ammunition) and Weedon (small arms). In 1922 the RAOC headquarters, regimental depot and School of Instruction moved from Woolwich to Hilsea Barracks on the edge of Portsmouth. (The School provided education and training in all aspects of the Corps' work, with the exception of ammunition which was taught at Bramley, where the Army School of Ammunition was opened that same year.) The Royal Army Clothing Depot, Pimlico, closed in 1932 and its stock was mostly transferred to Didcot.

In the 1930s re-armament and the mechanisation of the Army led to a redesign of the UK base. A Central Ordnance Depot (COD) and workshop to support vehicles, built on the site of the First World War National Shell Filling Factory, Chilwell, opened in 1937. The operation of this depot was notable in that it mirrored and tried to improve on best civilian practice at the time; this became a hallmark of RAOC development in the following decades. COD Branston was established in 1938, initially to serve as the Army's main clothing store, freeing up space at COD Didcot. At the outbreak of the Second World War there were five CODs: Branston, Chilwell, Didcot, Weedon and Woolwich.

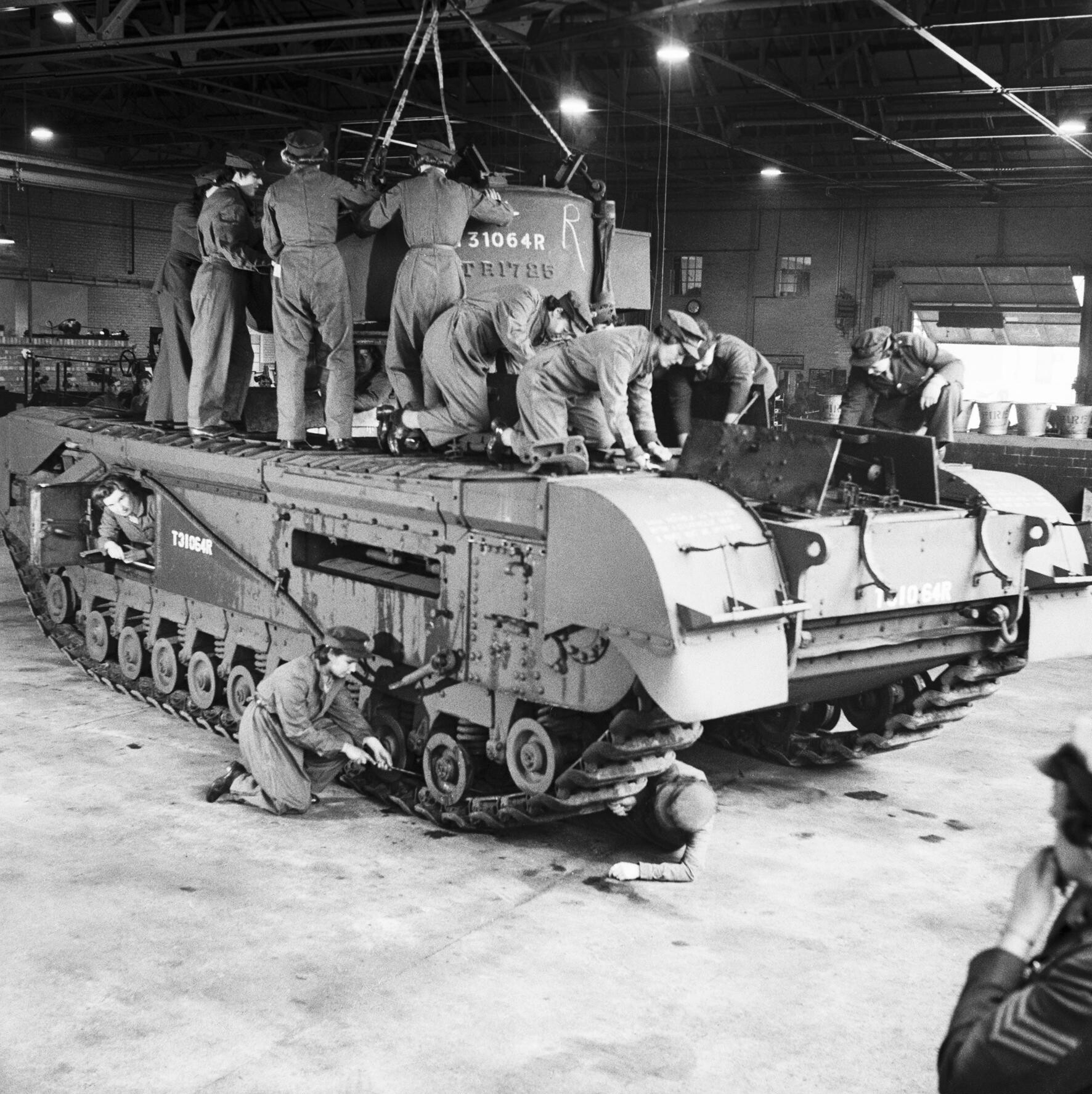
Women of the ATS working on a Churchill tank at an RAOC depot, 1942.

Woolwich was prone to aerial bombardment, so from September 1939 the War Department leased part of an industrial estate in Greenford, which provided 632,000 square feet of covered accommodation. A further COD to hold non-vehicle technical stores opened at Donnington, Shropshire in 1940 (in order to remove critical items from Woolwich to a less vulnerable site) and purpose-built depots for both tracked and wheeled vehicles were opened across the country. Woolwich then ceased operating as a COD (though by the end of 1942 it was again being used for bulk storage, albeit as a sub-depot of COD Greenford).

In the 1930s virtually all the Army's stockpile of ammunition was held at Bramley, which was vulnerable to air attack, so three new Central Ammunition Depots (CAD) were built: Serving south, central and northern England respectively, these were CAD Monkton Farleigh, Wiltshire (also known as CAD Corsham, an underground depot); CAD Nesscliffe, Shropshire; and CAD Longtown, Cumbria. By 1942 more storage capacity was required and another CAD was opened: Kineton. That same year a very large COD, widely spread out across the Oxfordshire countryside to mitigate the risk of bomb damage, opened at Bicester to hold stores principally to support the invasion of France.

Forward of the UK base, a huge array of temporary depots were built to meet the rapidly changing pace of war. Base Ordnance Depots (BOD) and Base Ammunition Depots (BAD) sprung up all over the world wherever a major line of communication was established.

Major changes took place after 1942 when the Royal Electrical and Mechanical Engineers (REME) absorbed most of the RAOC repair functions and the RAOC in turn took over the RASC's vehicle organisation. The more mobile nature of the Second World War also led to the creation of units at divisional and corps level with higher levels of mobility. The most notable of these was the ordnance field park, principally carrying vehicle and technical stores spares.

== Post-war to 1993 ==
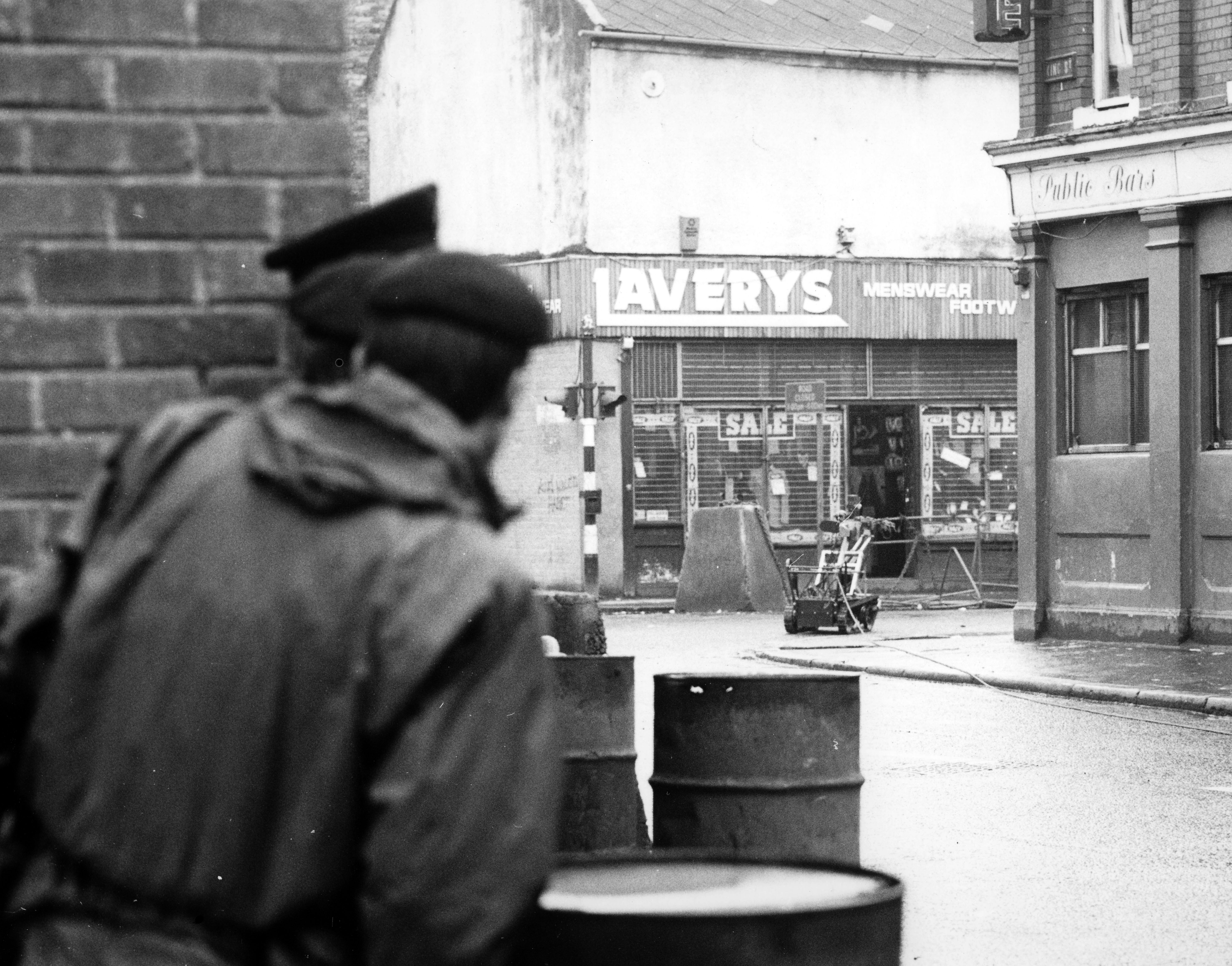
Wheelbarrow bomb disposal device being operated by a team from 321 EOD Coy RAOC, Northern Ireland 1978.

During the war the RAOC HQ (together with the RAOC School) had moved from Hilsea to Middleton Stoney (Bicester); in 1946 it moved again to Matthew Barracks, Tidworth and shortly afterwards to Deepcut. The regimental depot was also moved from Hilsea, in 1946, to Feltham Barracks, Middlesex; in 1955 it too moved to Deepcut. Hilsea, which had been used by the US Army during the war, continued to be used (alongside Deepcut) as a training facility for RAOC-enlisted National Service recruits; with National Service coming to an end the Barracks closed in 1962 (but not before serving again, temporarily, as the regimental depot from 1960-1962 while Deepcut was being rebuilt).

A major task that fell to the RAOC in the wake of the war was disposal of ammunition. As well as disposing of large amounts of surplus stock from depots at home, and returning in good order sites that had been requisitioned for the duration of the war, RAOC units were heavily involved in clearing ammunition from Germany's former depots and dealing with live devices still in the field. The RAOC's skills in bomb disposal were later put to increasing use in dealing with terrorist devices at home as well as in conflict zones overseas. The training of Ammunition Examiners, Ammunition Technicians and Ammunition Technical Officers at the Army School of Ammunition became progressively more specialised during the 1950s and '60s. In May 1970 a section of 321 EOD Unit was sent to Northern Ireland to support the local ammunition inspectorate in dealing with improvised explosive devices; what was initially a 6-month deployment marked the start of a much longer involvement through the Troubles.

In the period 1945–93 the RAOC, as with the rest of the Army, reduced greatly in size and closed its worldwide bases as garrisons withdrew. At the same time, there was considerable development of warehousing techniques and information technology (the first move towards computerisation came with the opening of an Automated Data Processing Installation at Chilwell in 1963 and one at Bicester the following year.)

The Free Officers Movement (Egypt) concluded the Anglo–Egyptian Agreement of 1954, signed on 19 October, with Great Britain. The agreement stipulated a phased evacuation of British troops from the Suez base, agreed to withdrawal of all troops within 20 months (that is, June 1956); maintenance of the base was to be continued; and allowed Britain to hold the right to return for seven years. The compromise solution to retain British influence over the Suez Canal base area, seen as vital in the event of any future Middle East war with the Soviet Union, was to arrange the Canal Zone depot area to be taken over by specially arranged British civilian contractors. As the risk of British-Egyptian ruptures over the Suez Canal rose, between September 20, 1955, and December 30, 1955, almost all the Middle East Land Forces Canal Zone depots and workshops were handed over to the contractors. Among them were 2 Base Workshop, 5 Base Ordnance Depot, and the Base Vehicle Depot all at Tel el Kebir; 9 Base Ammunition Depot at Abu Sultan near Deversoir Air Base; and the engineering base group (probably including Nos 8 and 9 Engineer Stores Base Depots at Suez and Fanara respectively). Other establishments included 33 Supply Reserve Depot and 10 Base Ordnance Depot.

In the mid-1960s new recruits were informed that 'The RAOC occupies nearly 90 different locations in the UK alone and world wide uses 86,000,000 square feet of storage space. Over 1,000,000 different items are held in stock and over 11,000,000 issues are made in a year'. By 1980 the RAOC was reduced to two CODs at Bicester and Donnington (COD Chilwell was closing, CODs Branston and Didcot had closed in 1963 and Weedon in 1965 after being downgraded from a COD in 1957), two CADs at Kineton and Longtown (Nesscliffe had closed in 1959, Corsham in 1963 and Bramley in 1974) and three Central Vehicle Depots: Ludgershall for 'A' (armoured) vehicles, and Ashchurch and Hilton for 'B' ('soft-skinned') vehicles (CVD Marchington having closed in 1965, CVDs Feltham and Irvine in the early 1970s).

Across the UK the structure of smaller Regional Depots, Ordnance Support Units (OSUs), Training Materiel Parks, supply depots and Ammunition Sub-Depots was steadily run down. A reconfiguration in the late 1960s provided four Regional Depots (Thatcham, Hereford, Catterick and Stirling) and nine OSUs: Aldershot, Ashford, Burscough, Colchester, Feltham, Old Dalby, Thetford, Tidworth and Woolwich (which had been downgraded following the closure of the Royal Ordnance Factory and the sale of the old Dockyard). At the height of the Northern Ireland troubles Ordnance Depot Kinnegar was a major logistic facility but is now much reduced.

Overseas, 3 BOD in Singapore closed in 1972 leaving a Composite Ordnance Depot in Hong Kong (that finally closed shortly before handover in 1997). The Middle East logistic base withdrew from Egypt in 1956 – 5 BOD and 9 BAD closing in 1955 – and was partially re-established in Aden; in turn this closed in 1967 with facilities being established in Sharjah and Bahrain (these, in turn, closed in 1971). The Ordnance depot in Gibraltar, where the Board of Ordnance had first established a facility in 1704, was transferred to the Royal Navy in 1964; and the depot in Malta, dating from the 1830s, closed in March 1972. The Ordnance Depot in Cyprus became part of the Joint Logistic Unit in 1988. In Germany, 15 BOD and 3 Base Ammunition and Petrol Depot (BAPD) closed in 1992.

Two post-war campaigns (Falklands 1982 and Gulf 1990/1) were unique in being fought in areas completely outside existing theatres. Temporary lines of communication were rapidly established that successfully managed huge surges in matériel.

== Formation of Royal Logistic Corps ==
On 5 April 1993, following the Options for Change review, the Royal Army Ordnance Corps united with the Royal Corps of Transport, the Royal Pioneer Corps, the Army Catering Corps, and the Postal and Courier Service of the Royal Engineers, to form the Royal Logistic Corps. Later that year the RLC withdrew from the Tower of London, where the RAOC had continued to maintain a centuries-old link; and the following year the last vestige of the once-vast ordnance depot left Woolwich, with the closure of Royal Arsenal (West) and departure of the Ordnance QAD (Quality Assurance Directorate).

== Appointments in the RAOC ==
=== Appointments in the RAOC ===
Prior to 1981/82 the Royal Army Ordnance Corps, in common with the rest of the British Army, used the idiosyncratic system of staff titles that was unique to British and most Commonwealth armies. After 1981 in NATO assigned units, principally those in British Army of the Rhine (BAOR), the standard NATO system was adopted with all appointments elsewhere changing the following year.

The senior RAOC appointment was Director Equipment and Ordnance Stores (DEOS) − always a Major-General − which during the 1920s became Director Ordnance Services (DOS). DOS was also a title given to senior RAOC officers at major commands such as Middle East Command, 21st Army Group and in more recent times BAOR. After the Somerville Logistic Reorganisation Committee Report of 1977 the head of the corps was re-titled Director General Ordnance Services (DGOS). Following the huge expansion of the RAOC in the Second World War the senior RAOC major general was designated Controller Ordnance Services (COS) from 1942 to 1948

- Deputy Director Ordnance Services (DDOS), usually a brigadiers' appointment, were found in the War Office (MOD after 1964) and in large headquarters throughout the Army.
- Chief Ordnance Officer (COO) was a brigadiers' or colonels' appointment and was used as an alternative to DOS, e.g. COO United Kingdom Land Forces
- Colonel Ordnance (Col Ord), a title principally used in the Ministry of Defence, this title was retained in DGOS after 1981 despite the fact that Supply was in general use elsewhere.
- Assistant Director of Ordnance Services (ADOS), usually a lieutenant colonel's, but occasionally a colonel's, appointment on the staff.
- Deputy Assistant Director of Ordnance Services (DADOS), a major's appointment on the staff.
- Corps Commander Royal Army Ordnance Corps (CCRAOC), a unique title for the brigadier in I (British) Corps held for only one year until the appointment was retitled Comd Sup 1 (Br) Corps.
- Commander Royal Army Ordnance Corps (CRAOC), a lieutenant colonel - occasionally a colonel in UK districts - and senior RAOC officer in a two star headquarters.
- Brigade Ordnance Officer (BOO), an officer, usually a captain, attached to a brigade.
- Brigade/District Ordnance Warrant Officer (B/DOWO) a warrant officer Class 1 - frequently a conductor - attached to a headquarters.
- Chief Ammunition Technical Officer (CATO), the senior ammunition officer in a large headquarters and was usually a lieutenant colonel, in a smaller headquarters the appointment was called Senior Ammunition Technical Officer (SATO) and usually held the rank of major.
- Before 1942 the senior Ordnance Mechanical Engineer in a headquarters was designated Principal Ordnance Mechanical Engineer (POME).
- Until 1920 the AOC and later RAOC, in common only with the Royal Engineers, maintained a rank of Second Corporal.

After 1980/1 most of these titles disappeared with the notable exception of CATO/SATO and DOWO/BOWO. All RAOC appointments gave the staff grade (e.g. Staff Officer Grade 2: SO2 suffixed with the word Sup), the head of corps in a headquarters irrespective of rank was titled Comd Sup. In MOD the titles of DGOS and DDOS were retained.

=== General Ordnance Services heads ===
This is a list of heads of the Royal Army Ordnance Corps

==== Controller of Ordnance Services ====
- Major General Sir Basil Hill KBE CB DSO (25 May 1939 to 31 December 1940)
- Major General Sir Leslie Williams KBE CB MC (28 June 1942 to 20 April 1946)
- Major General WW Richards CB CBE MC (21 April 1946 to 17 July 1947)

==== Director of Ordnance Services ====
- Major General LH Williams MC 23 April 1940 to 27 June 1942
- Major General KM Body CB CMG OBE 1 January 1941 to 27 June 1942
- Major General William W Richards CB CBE MC 18 July 1947 to 20 April 1948
- Major General Gerald TW Horne CB CBE 21 April 1948 to 20 April 1951
- Major General Sir Neville Swiney KBE CB MC 21 April 1951 to 21 April 1955
- Major General Sir Lionel Cutforth KBE CB 22 April 1955 to 21 April 1958
- Major General George O Crawford CB CBE 22 April 1958 to 21 April 1961
- Major General Sir John C Hildreth KBE 22 April 1961 to 19 November 1964
- Major General George le F Payne CB CBE 20 November 1964 to 18 March 1968
- Major General Alexander Young CB 19 March 1968 to 8 April 1971
- Major General Leonard TH Phelps CB OBE 9 April 1971 to 8 November 1973
- Major General Norman H Speller CB 9 November 1973 to 17 October 1976
- Major General Michael Callan 18 October 1976 to 3 April 1977

==== Director General of Ordnance Services ====
- Major General Michael Callan CB 4 Apr 1977 to 14 March 1980
- Major General James Brown CB 15 March 1980 to 11 March 1983
- Major General William L Whalley CB 12 March 1983 to September 1985
- Major General Gerald B Berragan CB September 1985 to March 1988
- Major General JA Hulme CB March 1988 to July 1990
- Major General David FE Botting CB CBE July 1990 to 4 April 1993

=== Directors of Supply Management ===
This is a list of directors of Supply Management of the Royal Army Ordnance Corps

- Brigadier David J Porter 1983 to 1988

== Regimental Matters ==
The RAOC's motto was that of the Board of Ordnance: Sua tela tonanti (literally "His [i.e. Jupiter's] Missiles to the one who is Thundering", but commonly translated as "To the Warrior his Arms").

The full-dress uniform of the RAOC had evolved from that worn by the Field Train Department in the eighteenth century, itself derived from the uniform of the Royal Artillery. Consisting of a blue tunic with red collar and cuffs and blue trousers with a double red stripe, it continued to be worn by the band (and in mess-dress form) until the corps' amalgamation.

The RAOC Band had first been formed in 1922; the regimental march (chosen by its first Bandmaster, WOI R. T. Stevens, as appropriate to the Corps' role and to its artisans) was The Village Blacksmith.

In common with the Royal Artillery, the RAOC had St Barbara as its patron saint. The garrison church, first at Hilsea and then at Deepcut, was dedicated in her name; the pulpit, organ, stained glass windows and several memorials were transferred from the former to the latter when Hilsea Barracks closed in 1962. There was also a St Barbara's Church at CAD Bramley, which had originally come from the depot in Pimlico; having done service in Bramley for 52 years it was again disassembled in 1978 and moved to Didcot.

=== The RAOC Gazette ===
The official journal of the corps was the RAOC Gazette.

== Recruiting ==
Before the Second World War, RAOC recruits were required to be at least 5 feet 2 inches tall (5 feet 4 inches for Driver Mechanics) and could enlist up to 25 years of age. They initially enlisted for three years with the colours and a further nine years with the reserve. Fitters could also choose six years with the colours and six years in the reserve, or eight and four years. Clerks and Storemen enlisted for six years and six years. They trained at the RAOC Depot, Hilsea Barracks, Portsmouth, before proceeding to specialist trade training. Armourers were only recruited from boy entrants and enlisted for twelve years. Armament Artificers trained at the Military College of Science, Woolwich for fifteen months. Half of them were serving soldiers who were already qualified fitters. Armament Artificers had to be at least 22 years of age and could enlist up to 30; they enlisted for twelve years and were promoted to Staff Sergeant as soon as they had completed training.

== See also ==
- Conductor (British Army)
- Staff Sergeant Major
- Allum Green
- Army engineering maintenance
