= Karl Hagedorn (1889–1969) =

German-born English painter

- Born: 11 September 1889; Berlin, German Empire
- Died: 1969 (aged 79–80)
- Education: Manchester School of Technology; Manchester School of Art; Slade School of Fine Art
- Occupations: Painter; Illustrator; Art teacher

Karl Hagedorn (11 September 1889 – 1969), who signed himself Hagedorn, was a painter and illustrator. He was born in Berlin in 1889 but settled in Manchester, England, in 1905.

== Biography ==
Hagedorn was educated in Berlin, and at Manchester School of Technology, Manchester School of Art, the Slade School of Fine Art, and in Paris, under Maurice Denis. Hagedorn became a leading figure in the Manchester art scene showing regularly at the Society of Modern Painters in the city, and also, from 1913 onwards, at the Royal Academy and the New English Art Club. He was naturalised as a British citizen in 1914, and served in the British Army during World War I.

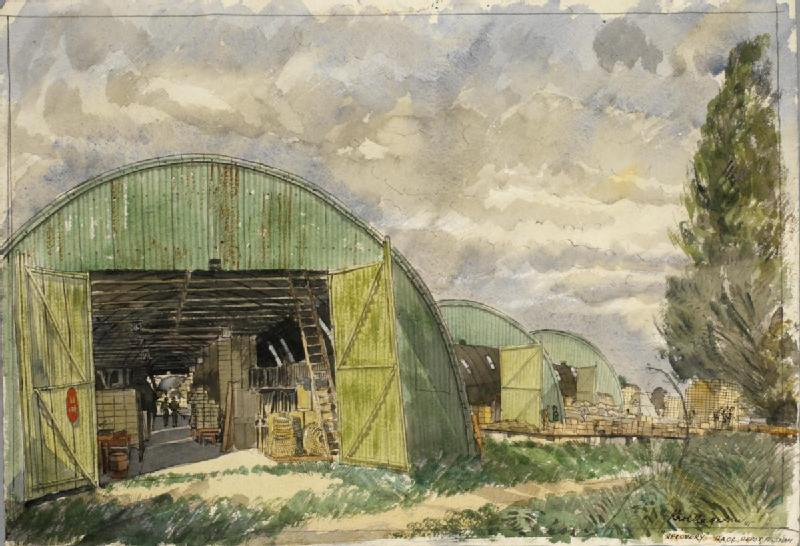
Recovery Stores at a RAOC Depot, Feltham (1945)

Hagedorn provided illustrations for the Empire Marketing Board, Shell and the Radio Times and also worked as a part-time art teacher at Epsom School of Art. He also taught at the Slade School of Fine Art. During World War II, he sold pictures of military subjects to the United Kingdom Government's War Artists' Advisory Committee. During the war, Hagedorn also worked for the Recording Britain project, producing views of Middlesex and Derbyshire, where he lived for a time.

Hagedorn's early works show Cubist and Futurist influences, although he later adopted a more conventional style. Some of his works are in the collections of Manchester City Art Gallery, the Victoria and Albert Museum, The Wellcome Library, the Imperial War Museum, and the United Kingdom Government Art Collection holds three examples.

Hagedorn died in 1969. An exhibition, Manchester's First Modernist: Karl Hagedorn 1889-1969, was held at the Whitworth Art Gallery, Manchester, in 1994.
