= Allum Green =

Hamlet in Hampshire, England

Coordinates: 50.8619°N 1.6049°W

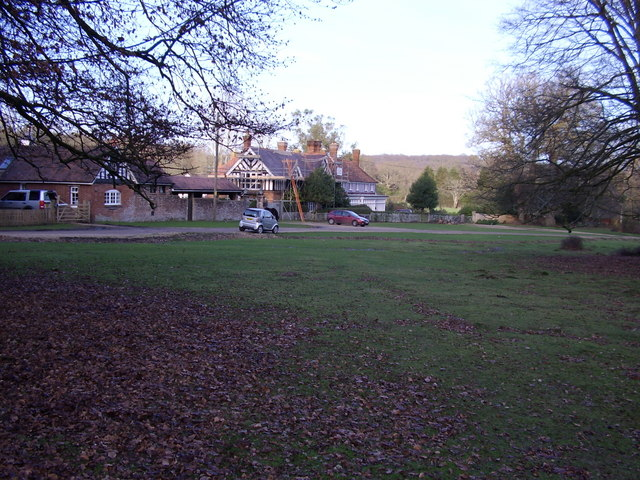
- Allum Green House

- Location within Hampshire
- OS grid reference: SU279071
- Civil parish: Lyndhurst
- District: New Forest
- Shire county: Hampshire
- Region: South East
- Country: England
- Sovereign state: United Kingdom
- Post town: Lyndhurst
- Postcode district: SO43
- Dialling code: 023
- Police: Hampshire and Isle of Wight
- Fire: Hampshire and Isle of Wight
- Ambulance: South Central
- UK Parliament: New Forest East

Allum Green is a hamlet southwest of Lyndhurst, Hampshire, England.

During the night of 5/6 September 1940 it was the scene of a Luftwaffe bombing raid, which resulted in the deaths of four British Army soldiers of the RAOC (Royal Army Ordnance Corps) and 14 men were injured.

The precise location of the bomb strike was on Allum Green House itself, which still exists and is a private home. The site is commemorated by a memorial bench erected in 1980 by comrades of the deceased.

Those killed were:

- Warrant Officer Class 2 H S Tyler
- Staff Sergeant S H Avon,
- Staff Sergeant E W E Gifford
- Sergeant A W Blunn.

It was mentioned in R. C. Sherriff's Journey's End, as Raleigh lived there. Vera Brittain bought Allum Green Cottage in May 1939.

== See also ==
- Commonwealth War Graves Commission
