= Feltham =

Suburb of West London

Coordinates: 51°26′59″N 0°24′32″W

- Town
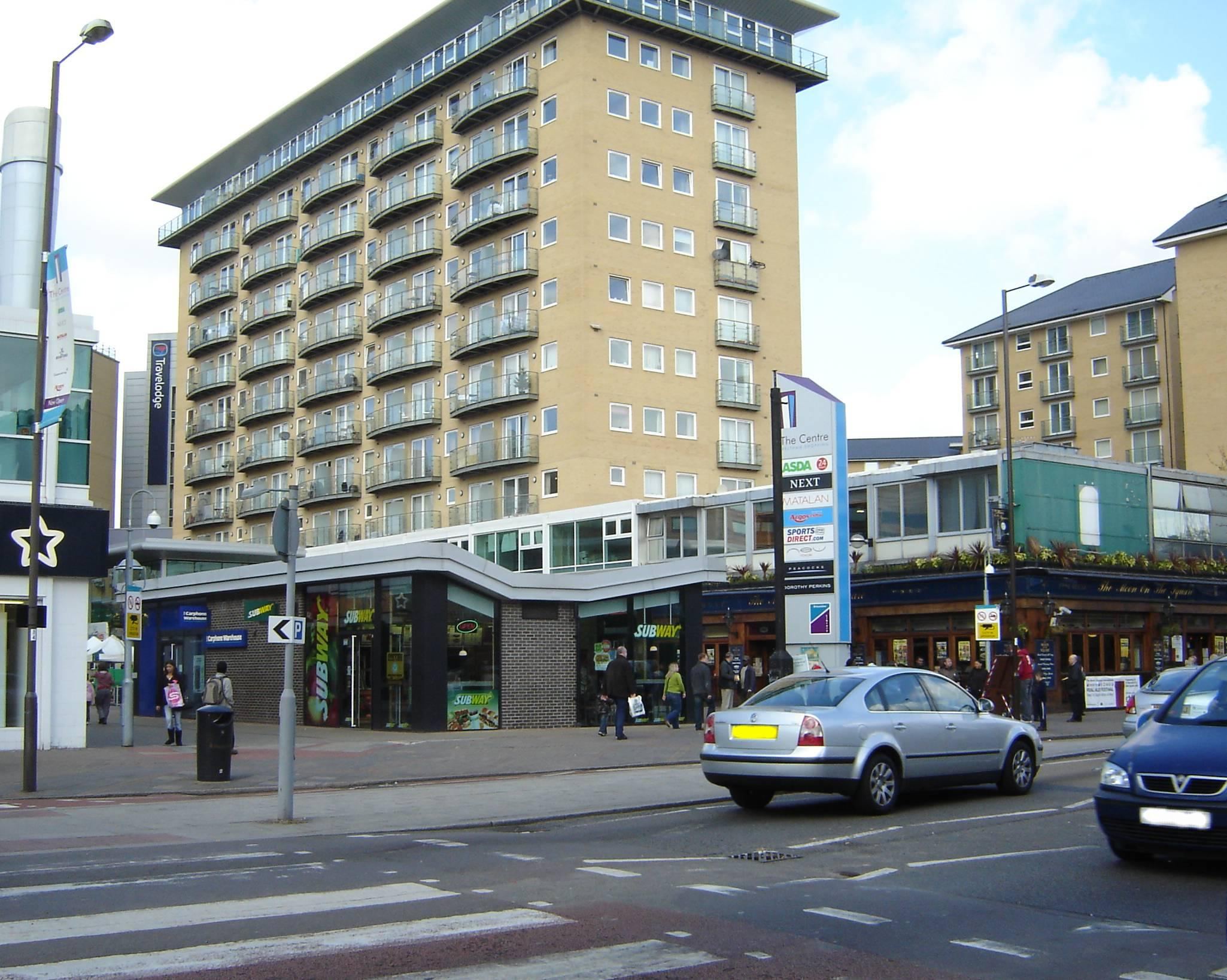
- High Street, Feltham town centre

- Location within Greater London
- Area: 6.56 km^{2} (2.53 sq mi)
- Population: 63,368 2011 Census
  - Density: 9,660/km^{2} (25,000/sq mi)
- OS grid reference: TQ105735
- London borough: Hounslow
- Ceremonial county: Greater London
- Region: London
- Country: England
- Sovereign state: United Kingdom
- Post town: FELTHAM
- Postcode district: TW13, TW14
- Dialling code: 020
- Police: Metropolitan
- Fire: London
- Ambulance: London
- UK Parliament: Feltham and Heston
- London Assembly: South West

Feltham (/ˈfɛltəm/) is a town in West London, England, 13.5 miles (21.7 km) from Charing Cross. Historically part of Middlesex, it became part of the London Borough of Hounslow in 1965. The parliamentary constituency of Feltham and Heston has been held by Labour Party MPs since 1992. In 2011, the population of the combined census area of Feltham, Bedfont and Hanworth was 63,368.

The economy of the town was largely agrarian until the early twentieth century, when it was transformed by the expansion of the London urban area. Most of the original High Street was demolished in the 1960s and 1970s. Further redevelopment in the early 2000s created the current shopping centre, which opened in 2006.

Heathrow Airport is to the north west of the town and is a major centre of employment for local residents. Feltham railway station is on the Waterloo to Reading line, between Twickenham and Staines-upon-Thames.

== History ==
Feltham formed an ancient parish in the Spelthorne hundred of Middlesex. The Domesday Book records 21 households and an annual value of six pounds sterling; it was held as lord and tenant-in-chief by Robert, Count of Mortain. A large area of ten cultivated ploughlands is recorded. Following Mortain's son's forfeit of lands (William's rebellion triggering the attainder), the land was granted to the Redvers/de Ripariis/Rivers family. The heir in that family, Hubert de Burgh ('Chief Justiciar and Earl of Kent') swapped Feltham and Kempton with Henry III for his manors of Aylsham in Norfolk and Westhall in Suffolk. In 1440 Henry VI granted numerous privileges to his joint royal custodian of the two manors, including a daily income of up to 12 shillings and that "corn, hay, horse and carriages and other goods and chattels should not be seized for the king's use".

While under total royal control following Henry VIII's full annexation of the manor into the Honour of Hampton Court, a lease of all of its manor court rights and "franchises, privileges, emoluments, and hereditaments" was granted under his daughter Elizabeth I to the Killigrew family of Kempton Park, for 80 years.

However the large manor itself passed 40 years later in 1631 by grant to Francis (Lord) Cottington, established at his new Hanworth Park, who had become Lord Treasurer, ambassador and leader of the pro-Spanish, pro-Roman Catholic faction in the court of Charles I. His nephew sold it, after a major fire and a very temporary loss caused by John Bradshaw, who arranged the King's execution, under the Commonwealth of England, to Sir Thomas Chambers. His son inherited Feltham manor, whose daughter by an empowering marriage to Admiral Vere (created Lord Vere) of Hanworth in the same historic county of Middlesex (created for him 1750) led to its next owner having a very high title and degree of wealth: her son, Aubrey Beauclerk, 5th Duke of St Albans inherited the manor and a dukedom with considerable land from a cousin. The Duke was a British landowner and a collector of antiquities and works of art, seated occasionally at Hanworth, who funded an excavation in Italy which produced many sculpture artifacts. Parting with much of the Duke's surfeit of large country houses, minor plot sales dividing the two ancient manors took place in the 19th century. Finally in the early 20th century, until death, the land now considered Feltham was either already subdivided by developers and farmers or owned by senior judge Ernest Pollock turned politician, (1st) Viscount Hanworth. He saw the very large Hanworth manor, which covered most of Hanworth parish divided up due to taxation; it became well-placed to cater to the demand for new homes with new intra-Borough transport links.

In this period in 1784 General William Roy set out the baseline of what would become the Ordnance Survey across Hounslow Heath, passing through Feltham. General Roy is commemorated by a local pub. The MOD Defence Geographic Centre maintains a base in Feltham, announced for disposal in the 2015–2020 Parliament.

In 1831, Feltham occupied an area of 2,620 acres (11 km^{2}), stretching into Hounslow Heath and had a population of 924. The Waterloo to Reading Line established a station here from its construction in 1848. From 1894 to 1904 the Felham parish was included in the Staines Rural District. In 1901 the parish had a population of 4,534 and accordingly in 1904 it was split from the rural district to form the Feltham Urban District. In 1932 the parishes of Hanworth and East Bedfont were also transferred from the Staines district to Feltham Urban District.

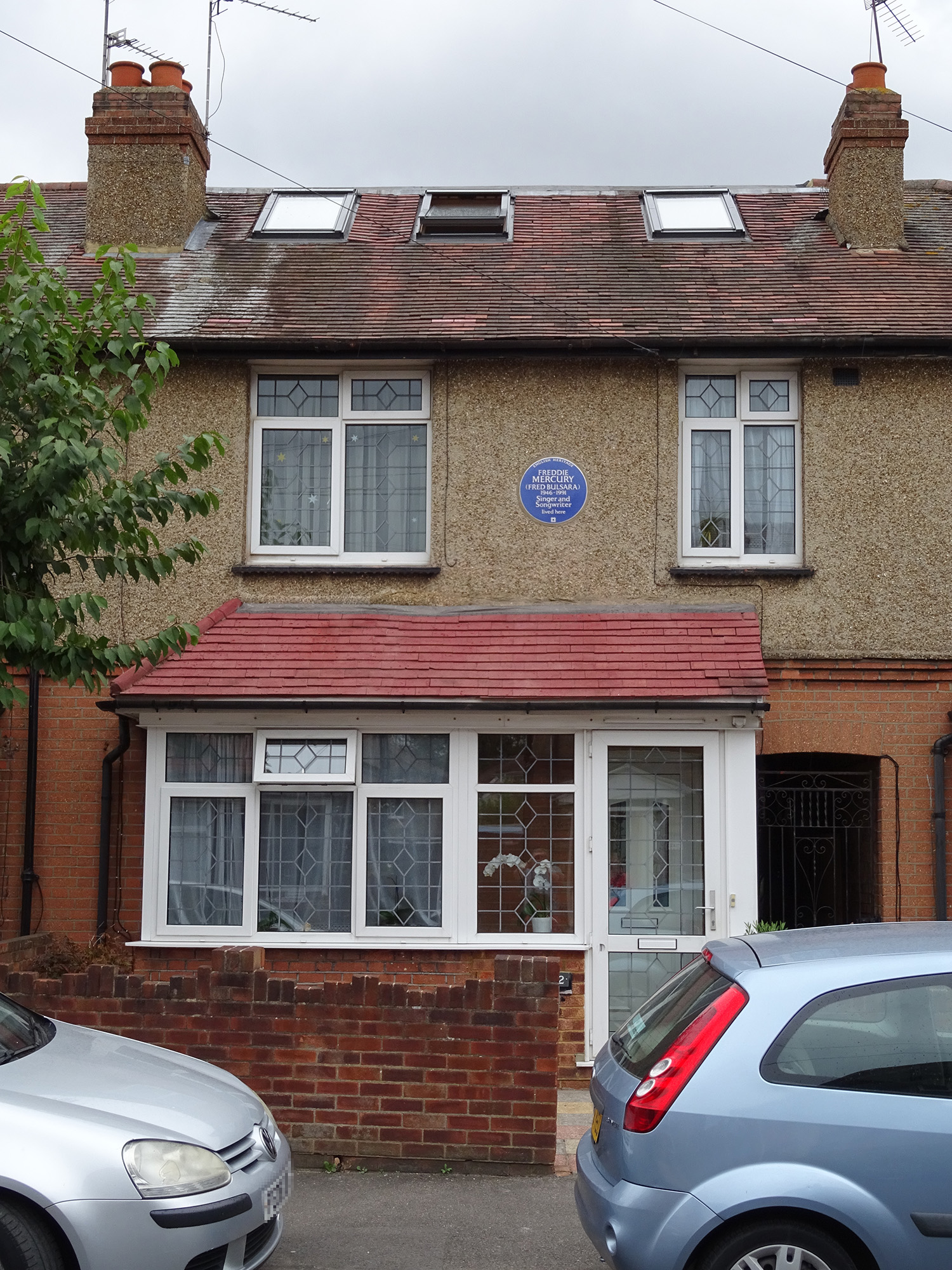
Former home of Freddie Mercury. A blue plaque commemorates his time here.

From the 1860s until late 1920s Feltham was also home to the "Cabbage King", A.W. Smith. Smith was considered one of the most successful market gardeners of the time, and his "Glass City" of greenhouses along Feltham's High street was unmatched. Smith also lived in the Feltham House (now in the middle of MOD site in the town) for a time. His greenhouses have since disappeared, but many of the fields still remain.

Feltham Urban District was disbanded in 1965 along with the Middlesex County Council following the London Government Act 1963, which transferred administrative control over parts of Middlesex to the new county of Greater London.

Although opened in 1910, major expansion took place in a similar period, at the extreme south-west of the post town, at Feltham Young Offenders' Institution or HM Prison Feltham, which is a major such institution providing a range of employments and rehabilitation schemes for young people. It has a border with Ashford and the neighbouring village of East Bedfont.

Famous former resident Freddie Mercury (born Farokh Bulsara in Zanzibar, 1946–1991) of rock band Queen was commemorated by a permanent, Hollywood-style granite star in Feltham's town-centre piazza, unveiled on 24 November 2009 (the eighteenth anniversary of Mercury's death) by Queen guitarist Brian May, alongside Freddie's mother, Jer Bulsara, and his sister. In 2011, owing to neglect and weather damage, Hounslow Council removed the memorial, resolving to substitute a smaller one elsewhere.

=== Recent developments ===
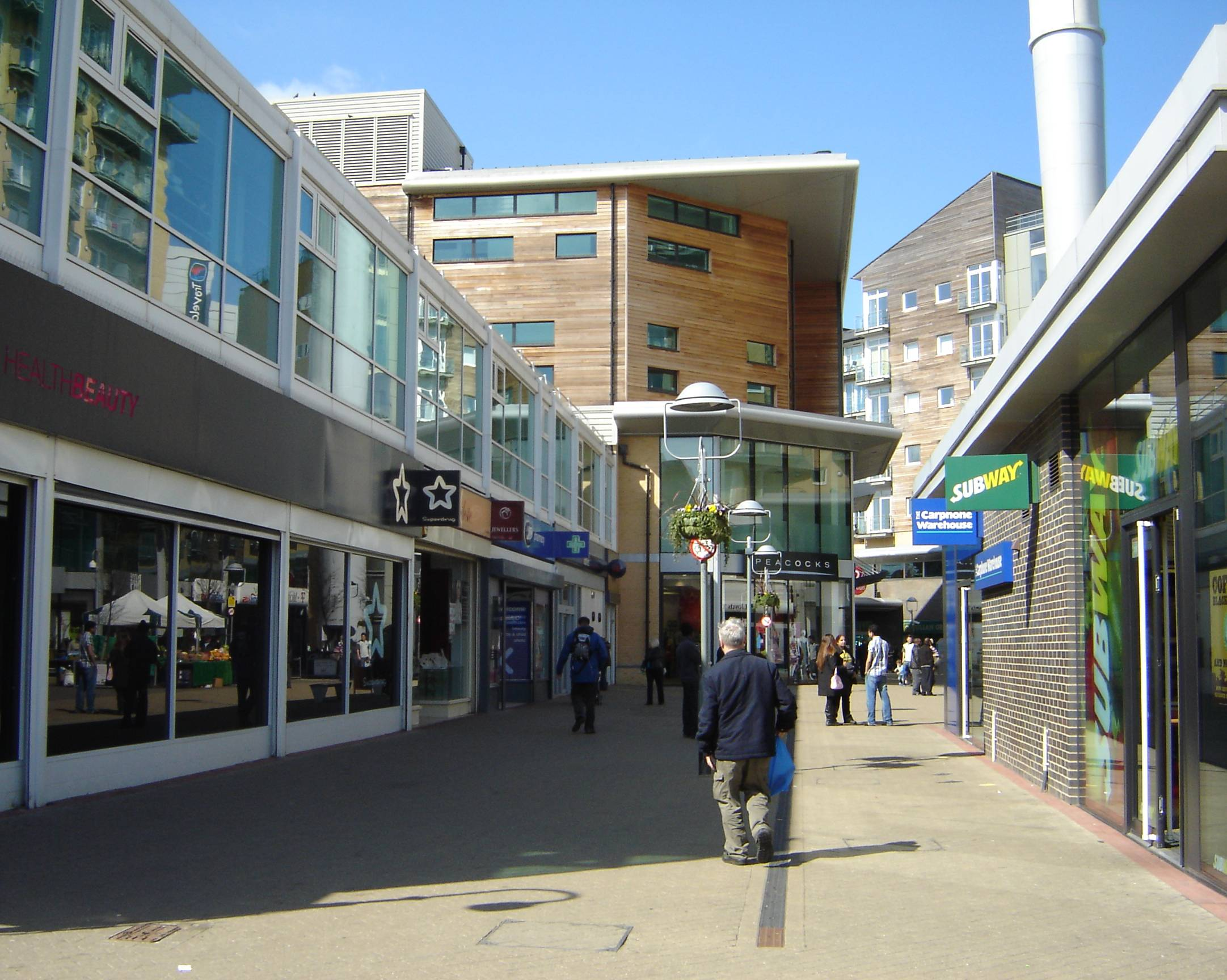
The centre, Feltham

Feltham's town centre developed in the period 1860–2010 when the focus of the village moved north from by St Dunstan's Church after the coming of the railway in 1848. For most of the twentieth century, it had a traditional-looking High Street, including more mock tudor shop fronts, and a large medieval manor house which was controversially demolished in the mid-1960s to make way for a car dealership and petrol station. This has since been demolished but replaced with a hardware, carpets and supermarket site Manor Park.

Most of the original High Street shops were also demolished in the mid-1960s through to the early 1970s. Victorian and Edwardian tall-storey terraced, semi-detached and detached homes are found on Hanworth Road and adjoining roads, and in the small conservation area at Feltham Pond on the High Street. Many old cottages and workman's terraces were demolished alongside the railway line to make way for brutalist high rise blocks of housing, of originally purely social housing to house the homeless and overcrowded people in the borough, such as Belvedere House, Hunter House and Home Court, demolished in the 2000s and replaced with mixed-ownership apartments in a more ornate style in a cluster, incorporating designer balconies and architectural demonstrations of free-form structure such as propped overhangs and an unobtrusive at street-level, multi-faceted floor plan.

The current shopping hub, The centre, Feltham (also known as the Longford Centre, if only by the original developers and some retail tenants), opened in 2006. It retained and refurbished many of the shop units built in the 1960s to replace the demolished buildings, along the High Street frontage, but replaced most of the others with new, larger units. Also added as part of the re-development was a Travelodge hotel, 800 homes, a new and larger library, and a medical centre. The anchor (and largest) store in the centre is an Asda hypermarket, coupled with fashion chains, small restaurants, a public house and cafés. Near to the retail park mentioned is a Tesco superstore and numerous grocery outlets are dotted along the area's High Street. Added to this are regular local trades/services in small clusters in the main named neighbourhoods of North Feltham and Lower Feltham. Prior to this large-scale redevelopment, the rock band Oasis filmed the video for their song Stand by Me in The Centre in 1997. Rap group So Solid Crew also filmed the music video for their 2003 single, Broke Silence, on Highfield Estate (nearby The Centre), before its eventual regeneration.

In retail, the closest destination with more than 100 outlets is Hounslow, centred less than 2 miles (3.2 km) to the north-east, followed by Kingston and Staines. Late 2017 saw the approval of the "Feltham Masterplan" by Hounslow council which will see the transformation of Feltham for the next 15 years.

In June 2024 a Surrey Police officer, who repeatedly drove his police car into a 10-month-old breeding heifer, called Beau Lucy, in Raleigh Road, was removed from frontline duties.

== Geography ==
Feltham is 13.5 miles (21.7 km) west south west of central London at Charing Cross and 2.5 miles (4.0 km) from the centre of Heathrow Airport.

The neighbouring settlements are Hounslow, Ashford, East Bedfont (including Hatton), Sunbury Common, Cranford and Hanworth.

== Governance ==
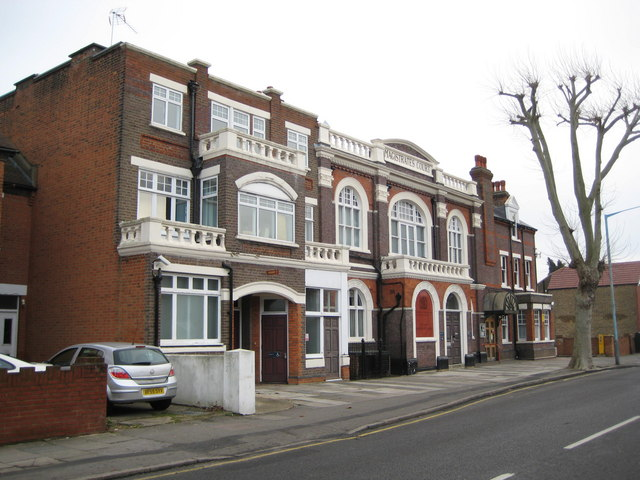
Feltham Magistrates' Court

There is no specific town council for Feltham; instead a Bedfont, Feltham, Hanworth area forum of councillors considers issues specific to the area on the London Borough of Hounslow's council.

The town forms part of Feltham and Heston parliamentary constituency (and the South West London Assembly constituency which elects the geographic element of members who advise, steer, assist and scrutinise the Mayor of London who is directly responsible for only certain designated policy areas such as Transport for London). There are two local government wards falling entirely within Feltham – Feltham North and Feltham West – though locals often consider sections of the Hanworth Park and Bedfont wards as forming part of Feltham. This area was represented in Parliament from 1992 to 2011 by Alan Keen (Labour). After his death, Labour candidate Seema Malhotra won the by-election.

Feltham Magistrates' Court was built in 1902 as a town hall but converted to a magistrates' court in 1906. The court closed in 2016.

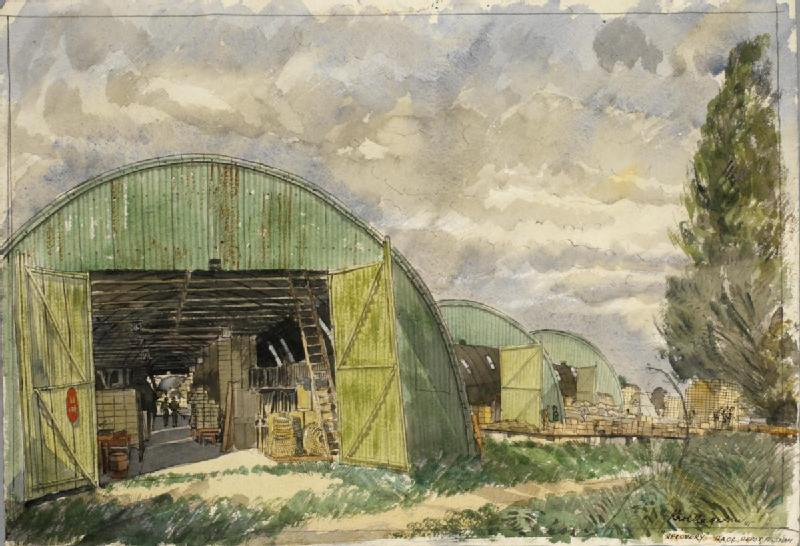
Recovery Stores at a RAOC Depot, Feltham by Karl Hagedorn, 1945

Immediately adjacent to the town centre is MoD Feltham, a secure 30-acre (12 ha) site belonging to the Ministry of Defence.

== Economy ==
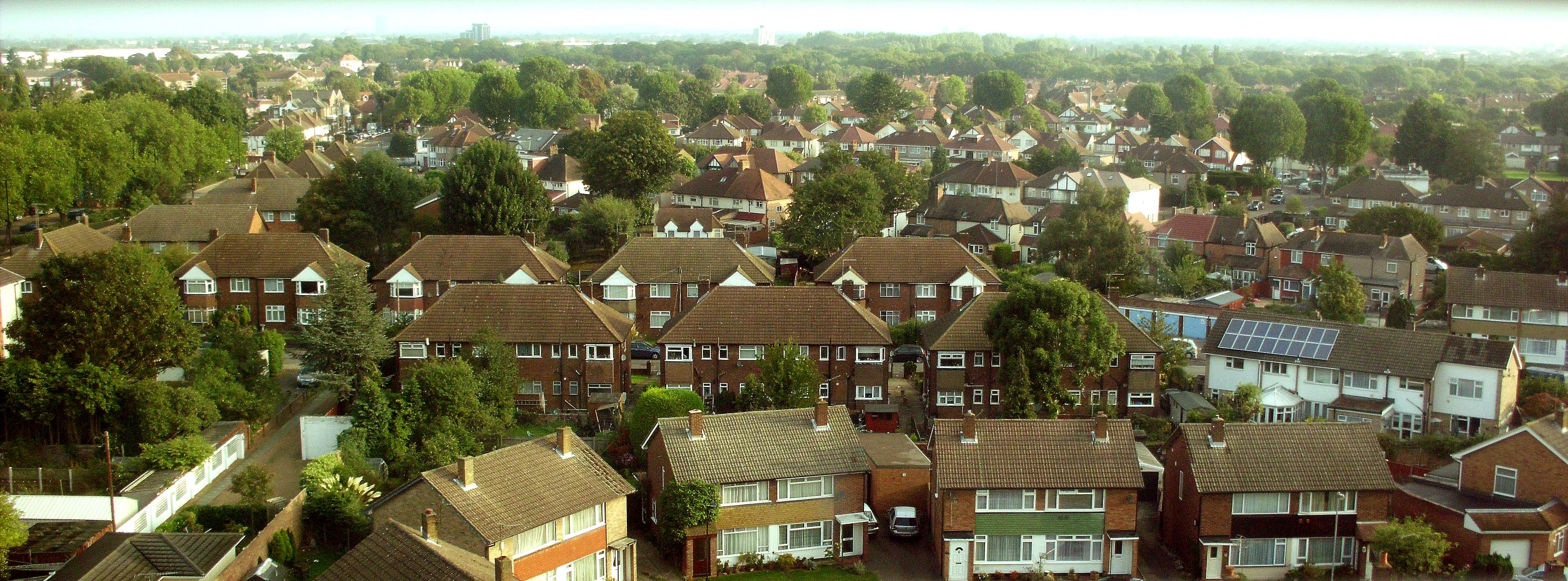
Skyline of West Feltham and Bedfont Lakes looking north-west.

The main economic activity of the Feltham area was market gardening until well into the twentieth century. A popular variety of pea known as the Feltham First is so-named for being first grown in the town. The market gardens were largely replaced with light industry, gravel and aggregate extraction, and new housing from the 1930s onwards.

Feltham has been associated with land and air transport for more than a century. In what is now the Leisure West entertainment complex of various buildings including cinema, bowling alley and restaurants, the Feltham tramcar was once manufactured and ran along the tracks of many municipal operators, though never in Feltham itself. In the same area of the town, aircraft manufacture was an important industry, particularly in the war years. Feltham was in the early and mid 20th century home to Britain's second largest railway marshalling yard which was geared towards freight, and was a target for German air force bombs in World War II.

The motor car manufacturer Aston Martin had its main factory in Feltham between 1926 (when it bought the former Whitehead Aircraft factory) and 1963. The site is now occupied by part of Leisure West.

A former company based in Feltham from 1911 until the closure of its factory in the 1980s was Minimax Limited, manufacturers of fire extinguishers.

The largest local employer is Heathrow Airport. Associated businesses conglomerate in the business parks of the TW14 (Bedfont and Feltham North) part of the post town particularly in logistics and couriers who store and carry the air freight of much of Britain.

However, accessibility of parts of Central London and a good local road network have also made Feltham a base for a number of high-tech companies, including DHL and Arqiva. The latter is notable in having a telecommunications port (teleport) in Feltham which provides transmission and distribution facilities for TV companies including Sky and Channel 5.

== Leisure ==
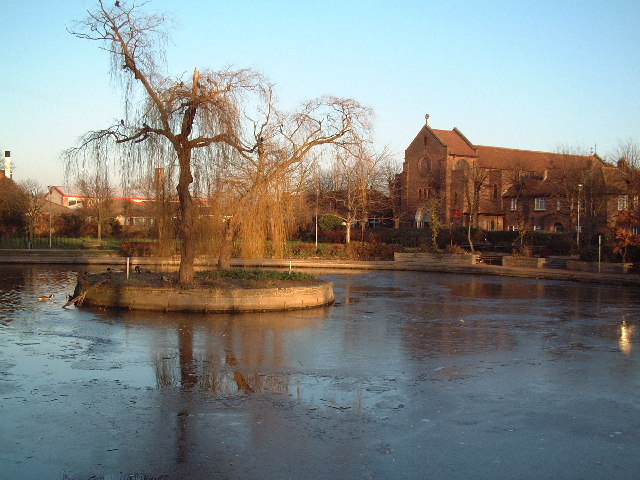
Frozen pond on Feltham Green

Feltham has in its land use considerably more open spaces than average in (Greater) London; bounding it to the east is a natural small river, the Crane separating off the once vast Hounslow Heath to the east, stretching from north by Harlington south to Hampton, London until the early 20th century. To other sides it includes a country park formed from converted gravel pits (Bedfont Lakes) with rolling adjacent meadows open to walkers by its railway and (within the post town) one of Greater London's first airfields, London Air Park at Hanworth, which has well-trimmed grass, is surrounded by trees and is a large and sports-oriented public open space.

Public venues include Feltham Assembly Hall, opened in 1965 in Feltham Park, community rooms in the new library, as well as several residents association halls and clubs. Since the controversial removal in 2008 of the Feltham Community Association from the Feltham People's Centre (the former Feltham Hotel), the town has lacked a dedicated community centre and after protests from the community a new one I now being built on Feltham Green with a planned opening date of spring 2025

Springwest Academy (formerly Feltham Comprehensive School) and Rivers Academy West London (known as Longford School until 2011) both have excellent sports facilities. These supplement the Hanworth Air Park Leisure Centre and Library, operated by Fusion Leisure on behalf of Hounslow Council. Leisure West (a privately developed and managed complex of entertainment and dining facilities including a multiplex cinema, tenpin bowling alley, bingo club and restaurants) opened on the former industrial sites around Browell's Lane in the mid-1990s. Feltham has a Non-League football club Bedfont & Feltham F.C. who play at the Orchard in East Bedfont. Bedfont Recreation Ground hosts Brentford Women.

== Demography ==
The 2011 ethnic groups in Feltham with a total population of 63,368 were:

- 51.4% White British
- 20.2% Asian
- 10.1% Other White (not covering Irish or Traveller)
- 9.6% Black

This is combined data for the Feltham North and West wards with Feltham North being slightly more ethnically diverse than Feltham West.

== Religion ==
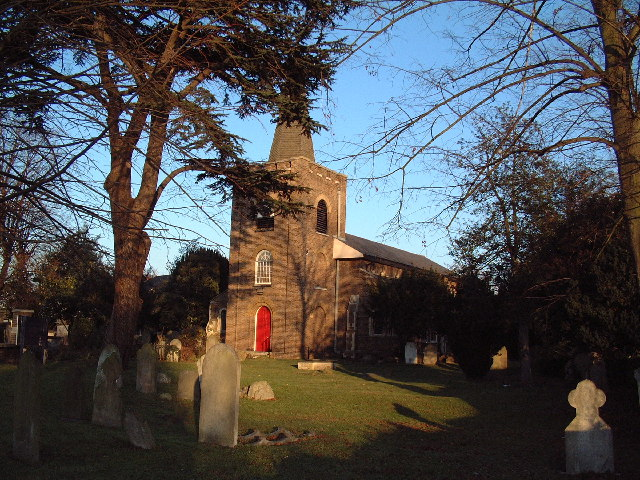
St Dunstan's Church

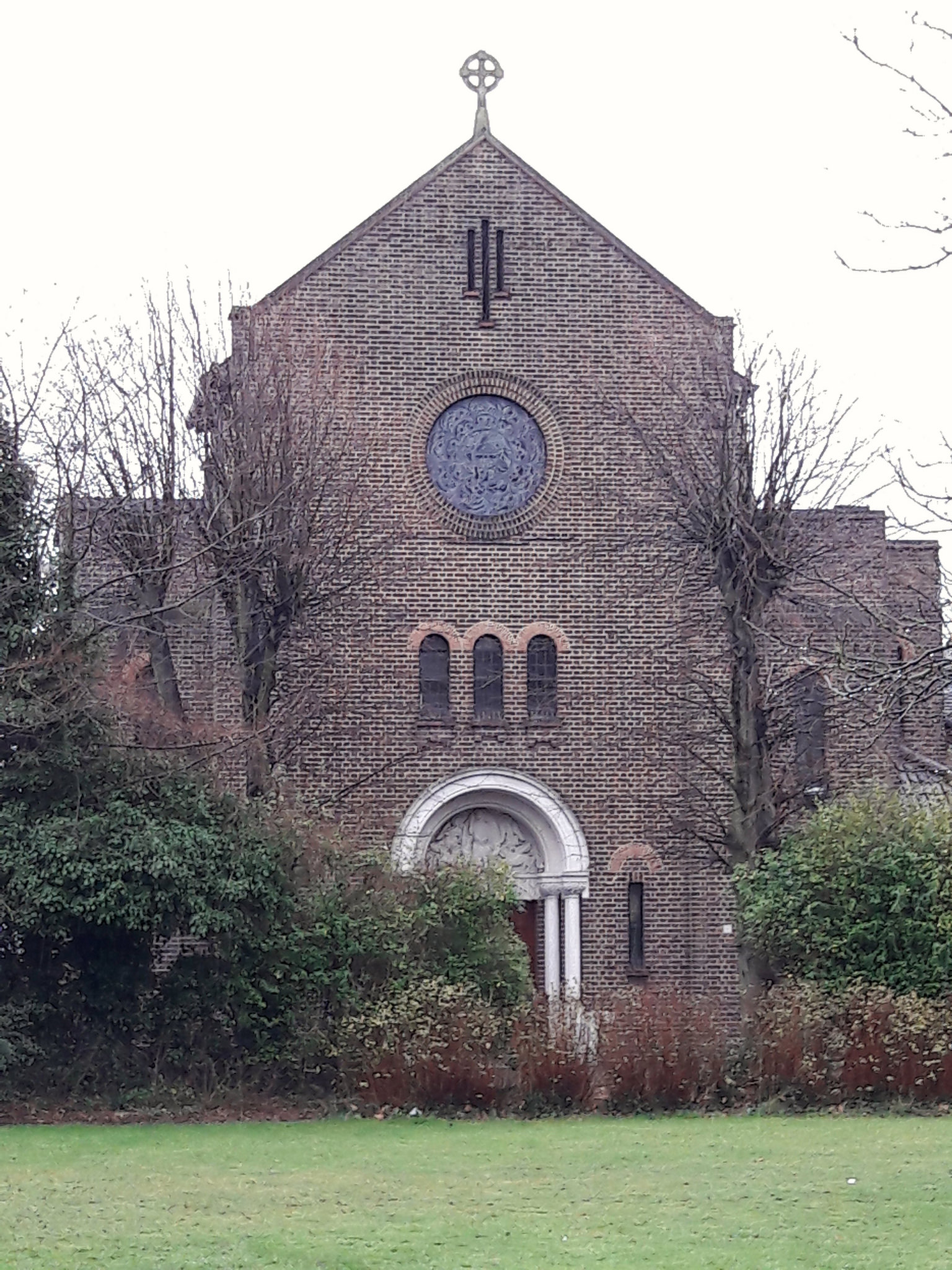
Catholic Church of St Lawrence

The town remains among the largest ecclesiastical parishes of the Diocese of London within the Church of England. The parish church of St Dunstan and the Parish of Feltham have joined with two other churches to create a larger Ecumenical Parish of Feltham founded in the late 1970s. This joins the church together in activities and church services with Southville Methodist Church and the United Free Church of Feltham.

On 24 June 1868, Father Ignatius founded an Anglican Benedictine convent in the parish. Feltham Priory, or Feltham Nunnery, was dedicated to Saints Mary and Scholastica (twin sister of St Benedict). It lasted five years before the nuns initiated a series of moves which would see them relocate to Curzon Park Abbey in Chester in 1988.

The tall spire fronting tower of an additional church first built 1880–1898, to St Catherine, opposite the railway station forms the façade of St Catherine's House, a London Borough of Hounslow Housing office and temporary housing accommodation. As of August 2014, St Catherine's House is now closed because the council have moved out and relocated elsewhere.

The Roman Catholic church of Saint Lawrence, with its attendant primary school, faces onto Feltham Green.

== Transport ==
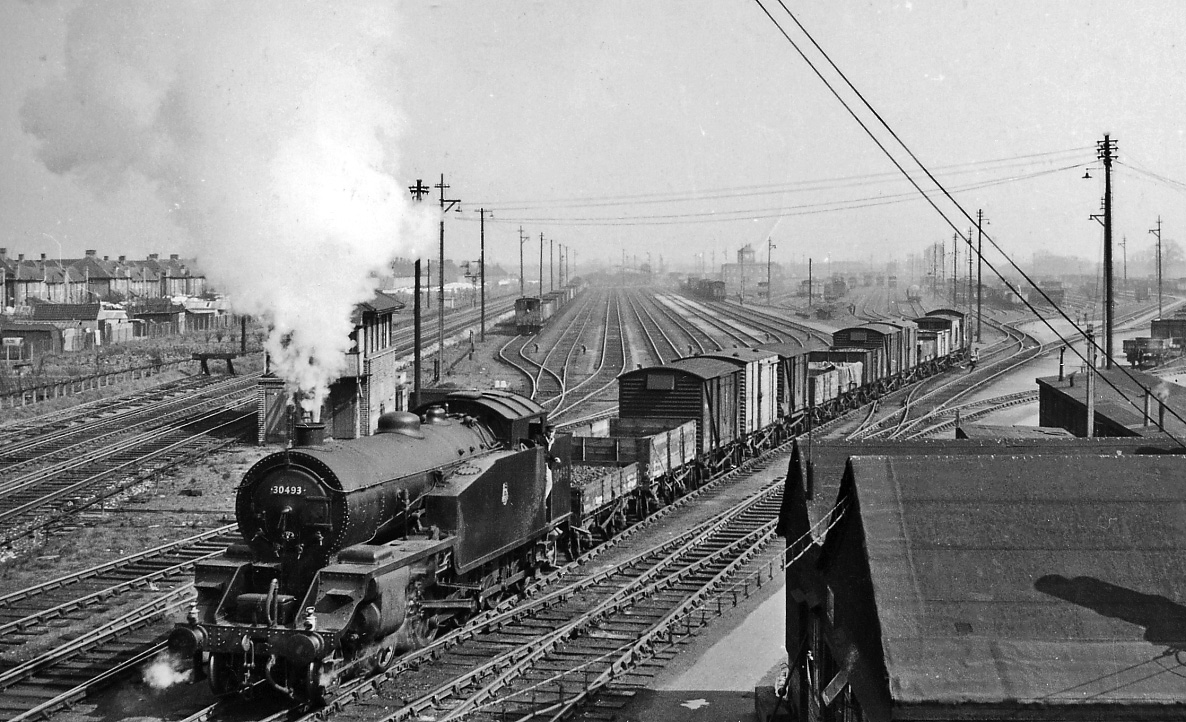
Feltham marshalling yard (1918–1969) seen here in 1958.

=== Tube ===
Nearby Hatton Cross, which is on the Heathrow branch of the Piccadilly line provides a Central London and Heathrow rail option to Feltham, and is 1.5 miles (2.4 km) north of the town centre. Bus routes 90, 117, 235, 285, 490, H25 and H26 also run frequent services through the town, as well as bus route 116 through Feltham North.

=== Railway ===
The town is served by Feltham railway station on the Waterloo to Reading Line, Two branch line services operate on the line here, to Windsor and Weybridge.

=== Bus and coach services ===
The town has London Buses services to Kingston upon Thames, Richmond, Brentford, Heathrow, Staines-upon-Thames, Northolt, Isleworth and Sunbury on Thames. Intervening places such as Hayes, Hounslow, Hampton Court/Hampton, Twickenham and Ashford are called at.

Long-distance express services are offered predominantly from various sides of Heathrow to places such as Slough, Reading, Berkshire and Croydon, the latter under the London Buses pricing and operational scheme.

== Notable people ==
- Vic Briggs, guitarist with The Animals, was born in Feltham and grew up in Twickenham.
- Dave Brock, musician (Hawkwind)
- Steven Caulker, professional footballer, born in Feltham.
- Thomas Denman (1733–1815), midwifery pioneer, lived in Feltham.
- Film writer and director Edmund Goulding (1891–1959) was born in Feltham.
- Andrew Hall, hedge fund manager.
- Buster Lloyd-Jones (1914–1980), veterinarian, was born in Feltham.
- Actor Derek Martin, who played Charlie Slater in EastEnders, lived in Feltham.
- Brian May, of the rock band Queen, once lived in Feltham.
- Freddie Mercury (1946–1991), also of the rock band Queen, lived in Feltham. A monument on Feltham High Street recognises him.
- Jimmy Page, guitarist with Led Zeppelin, lived in Feltham.
