= Reginald Hayward =

Reginald Hayward may refer to:

- Reginald Hayward (politician) (1880–1961), funeral director, mayor and MLA in British Columbia, Canada
- Reginald Hayward (VC) (1891–1978), South African Victoria Cross recipient
- Reggie Hayward (born 1979), American football player
