= Arthur Leslie Walter Newth =

British Army officer (1897–1978)

- Born: 1897
- Died: 27 September 1978 (aged 81); Shepton Montague, Somerset, England
- Military career
- Allegiance: United Kingdom
- Branch: British Army
- Service years: 1914–1955
- Rank: Brigadier
- Service number: 2499
- Unit: Gloucestershire Regiment
- Commands: 16th (Service) Battalion, Cheshire Regiment (1918); 2/23rd (County of London) Battalion (1919); 4th Battalion of the Gloucestershire Regiment (1929–1934); 144th (Gloucester and Worcester) Infantry Brigade (1934–1938); 135th Infantry Brigade
- Conflicts: First World War; Second World War
- Awards: Commander of the Order of the British Empire; Distinguished Service Order; Military Cross; Mention in Despatches x2

Arthur Leslie Walter Newth CBE DSO MC JP DL TD (1897 – 27 September 1978) was a British Army officer. Whilst attending Bristol Grammar School he became a corporal in the school's cadet corps. In 1914 Newth was commissioned into the 4th (City of Bristol) Battalion of the Gloucestershire Regiment. He served with the battalion on the Western Front and received the Military Cross for gallantry in 1915. Newth was promoted to the acting rank of lieutenant-colonel in 1918 to command the 16th (Service) Battalion of the Cheshire Regiment. He was 21 when he was appointed and was probably the youngest battalion commander of the war.

In 1919 Newth commanded the 2/23rd (County of London) Battalion and was appointed to the Distinguished Service Order. He afterwards returned to the Gloucestershire Regiment serving as adjutant and then commander of the 4th Battalion. From 1934, as a colonel and then a brigadier, he commanded the Territorial Army's 144th (Gloucester and Worcester) Infantry Brigade. He was appointed a Commander of the Order of the British Empire in 1938. In the Second World War Newth commanded the 135th Infantry Brigade. He served in the North African campaign and as director of Army Welfare Services in the Central Mediterranean and was twice mentioned in despatches. He retired from the army in 1955.

In business Newth was a director of Harris & Hassell (1929) Ltd and C. Newth and Sons, furniture makers. He was chairman of the Bristol and Bath district committee of the South-Western Regional Board for Industry from 1956 to 1965 and served as master of the Worshipful Company of Furniture Makers for 1975–76. He was deputy lieutenant of Gloucestershire and Somerset and a justice of the peace.

== Early life ==
Newth was born in 1897, the son of a Bristol furniture dealer. The family was solidly Baptist. Newth attended the City Road Baptist Church, where his parents were long standing members, just as his grandparents had been. His maternal grandfather was once the minister.

Newth attended Bristol Grammar School from 1908 to 1913 and was a member of the school's Junior Division of the Officers Training Corps, reaching the rank of cadet-corporal. Newth was commissioned as a second lieutenant in the 4th (City of Bristol) Battalion of the Gloucestershire Regiment on 12 March 1914. This was a Territorial Force unit, a part-time reserve of the British Army.

== First World War ==
Newth was promoted to lieutenant on 26 August 1914, weeks after the outbreak of the First World War. He was promoted to the temporary rank of captain on 2 October 1915. Newth was serving in the 1st/4th battalion of his regiment (the first-line territorials, who had volunteered for service on the Western Front) at the trenchline in Hébuterne, France, on the night of 6/7 October. A British party repairing the barbed wire entanglement came under fire from a German machine gun, leaving one man wounded and hanging on the wire. Newth led a small party to successfully recover the man and was awarded the Military Cross for gallantry.

Newth was promoted to the substantive rank of captain on 22 June 1917, retaining seniority from the date of his appointment to the temporary rank. He was acting major from 24 September 1917 whilst employed at the battalion headquarters. Relinquished rank on ceasing to be employed there 25 December 1917. On 30 April 1918 Newth was appointed to command the 16th (Service) Battalion of the Cheshire Regiment, a New Army unit. At the time of his appointment he was 21 years old and is likely the youngest appointed during the war. On 6 June 1918 he was granted the acting rank of lieutenant-colonel while serving as battalion commander. He relinquished the command and acting rank on 5 December 1918, just weeks after the end of the war.

== Inter-war years ==
Newth was appointed to the temporary rank of lieutenant-colonel whilst in command of the 2/23rd (County of London) Battalion of the London Regiment from 4 February 1919. Newth was appointed to the Distinguished Service Order in the 1919 Birthday Honours. He relinquished command of the battalion, and his temporary rank, on 29 November 1919. By 7 February 1923 Newth had reverted to his substantive rank of major and was appointed adjutant of the 4th Battalion of the Gloucestershire Regiment, holding this appointment for four years. Newth was promoted to lieutenant colonel and commander of the 4th Battalion on 16 February 1929. He received the Territorial Decoration on 1 March 1929. Newth became director, in 1929, of Harris & Hassell (1929) Ltd, founded that year and using the name of a former Bristol motor car dealer.

Newth was promoted to the brevet rank of colonel on 16 February 1933. He received the substantive rank on 1 December 1934 when he was appointed to command the Territorial Army's 144th (Gloucester and Worcester) Infantry Brigade. He was granted the temporary rank of brigadier on 24 November 1937 though this ceased when his appointment as brigade commander expired on 1 December 1938. In 1938 he was appointed a Commander of the Order of the British Empire.

== Second World War ==
On 26 August 1939, days before the entry of Britain into the Second World War, Newth was appointed a commander on the British Army staff, with the temporary rank of brigadier. For some time he commanded the 135th Infantry Brigade, a UK-based formation, but later saw service in the North African campaign. Newth was mentioned in despatches for "gallant and distinguished services in North Africa" on 16 September 1943 and in the same year received the US Legion of Merit.

From 1943 to 1945 Newth served as director of Army Welfare Services in the Central Mediterranean. He was mentioned in despatches again on 22 February 1945 for "gallant and distinguished services in the field". On 11 April 1945 Newth reverted to supernumerary role within the territorial army, though on 30 December he was granted the honorary rank of brigadier.

== Post-war ==
In peace time Newth lived in Pensford, Somerset with his wife Ruth; they had two sons and a daughter. He was a director of C. Newth and Sons, furniture makers. Newth was appointed a deputy lieutenant of Gloucestershire in 1950. He received the Territorial Efficiency Decoration with two clasps on 15 June 1951. Newth was appointed a justice of the peace in 1952. He reached the age limit for British Army service on 11 March 1955 and retired.

Newth was chairman of the Bristol and Bath district committee of the South-Western Regional Board for Industry from 1956 to 1965. His firm, Charles Newth and Sons, voluntarily entered liquidation on 26 March 1962. Newth was appointed honorary colonel of the 5th Battalion of the Gloucestershire Regiment, a Territorial Army unit, on 31 March 1967. He became deputy lieutenant of Somerset in 1974 and was master of the Worshipful Company of Furniture Makers for 1975–76.

Newth died at his home in Shepton Montague, Somerset on 27 September 1978, at the age of 81. His funeral was held at the village's St Peter's Church.
