= Wiltshire Regiment =

Duke of Edinburgh's (Wiltshire Regiment) Wiltshire Regiment (Duke of Edinburgh's)
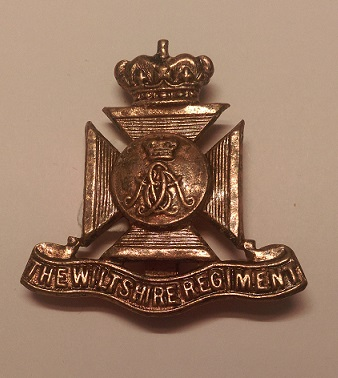
- Wiltshire Regiment Cap Badge
- Active: 1881–1959
- Country: United Kingdom
- Branch: British Army
- Type: Infantry
- Role: Line infantry
- Size: 1–2 Regular battalions 1 Militia battalion 1–2 Territorial and Volunteer battalions Up to 8 Hostilities-only battalions
- Garrison/HQ: Le Marchant Barracks, Devizes
- Nicknames: The Springers, The Moonrakers, The Splashers
- Motto: Honi Soit Qui Mal y Pense
- March: Quick: The Wiltshire, The Farmer's Boy; Slow: Auld Robin Grey
- Anniversaries: Ferozeshah, 21 December

Commanders
- Ceremonial chief: The Prince Philip Duke of Edinburgh (1953–1959)

The Wiltshire Regiment was a line infantry regiment of the British Army, formed in 1881 under the Childers Reforms by the amalgamation of the 62nd (Wiltshire) Regiment of Foot and the 99th Duke of Edinburgh's (Lanarkshire) Regiment of Foot.

The regiment was originally formed as the Duke of Edinburgh's (Wiltshire Regiment), taking the county affiliation from the 62nd Foot (which became the 1st Battalion) and the honorific from the 99th Foot (which became the 2nd Battalion). In 1921, the titles switched to become the Wiltshire Regiment (Duke of Edinburgh's).

After service in both the First and Second World Wars, it was amalgamated with the Royal Berkshire Regiment (Princess Charlotte of Wales's) into the Duke of Edinburgh's Royal Regiment (Berkshire and Wiltshire) in 1959, which was, in 1994, merged with the Gloucestershire Regiment to form the Royal Gloucestershire, Berkshire and Wiltshire Regiment, which later amalgamated with the Devonshire and Dorset Regiment, the Royal Green Jackets and The Light Infantry to form The Rifles, which continues the lineage of the regiment. The regiment's depot was at Le Marchant Barracks in Devizes.

== History ==
=== Predecessor formations ===
==== 62nd (Wiltshire) Regiment of Foot ====
The senior partner in the amalgamated Wiltshire Regiment was the 62nd Regiment of Foot. The 62nd was formed in 1756, originally as the second battalion of the 4th Regiment of Foot. In 1758, the battalion was redesignated as the 62nd Regiment of Foot. Although a regiment of the line, many of its companies were initially deployed as marines, serving with Admiral Boscawen's fleet during the Siege of Louisbourg in 1758. The balance of the regiment remained in Ireland where they defended Castle Carrickfergus from a French invasion force in 1758.

After its initial baptism, the regiment would go on to see active service in the American Revolutionary War. Being used as light infantry, the regiment took part in General John Burgoyne's doomed campaign, culminating in the Battles of Saratoga. Twelve years after the end of the American Revolution, the regiment would fight against revolutionary and imperial France. Taking part in campaigns in West Indies, Sicily, and the Peninsula where they won the battle honours "Nive" and "Peninsula".

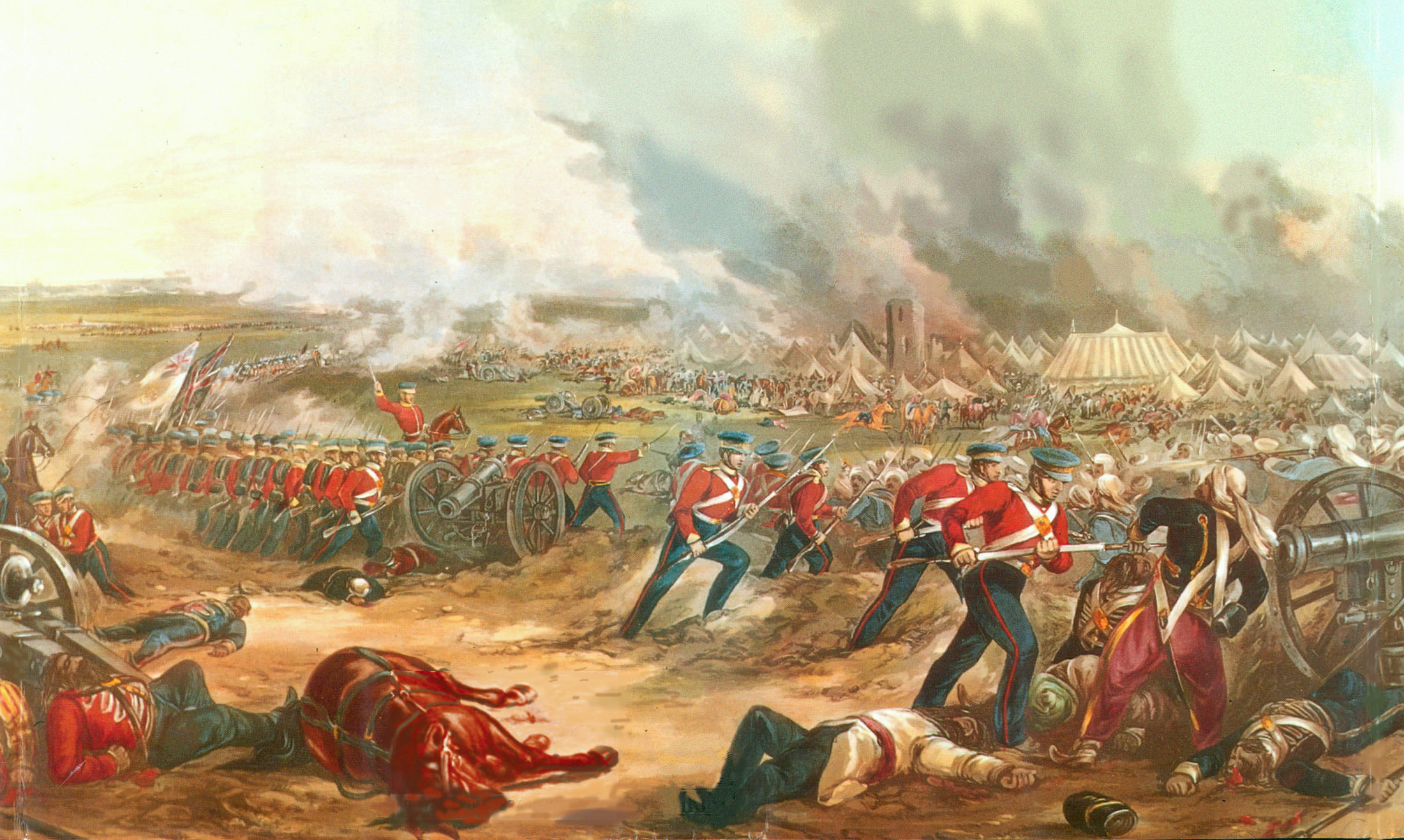
Battle of Ferozeshah- Depiction of the 62nd Regiment on the second day of the battle by Henry Martens. 62nd evident by the buff colour of the flag and of the facings of the British regulars shown. The figures in the foreground are likely members of the regiment's light company.

Following the conclusion of the Napoleonic wars, the 62nd rotated through the expanding British Empire. It would serve as parts of the garrisons in Canada and Ireland before being dispatched to India. While in India, the 62nd became part of General Sir Gough's army during the First Sikh War. During the war, although it lost its colours twice to various mishaps, the regiment would earn its proudest honour at the Battle of Ferozeshah. In tribute to the service of its sergeants, who commanded the regiment when virtually all the officers were killed or incapacitated, the regiment would celebrate every 21 December as Ferozeshah Day.

Eventually, the regiment rotated back to the Home Islands in time to be available for the Crimean War. From 1854 to 1856, the regiment served in the Crimea, mainly as part of the forces besieging the port of Sevastopol. The 62nd took part in the failed attack on the Great Redan Bastion, suffering heavy casualties.

With the end of the Crimean War, the 62nd returned to its task of policing the British Empire. During its last quarter century as an independent regiment, the 62nd would serve in Canada, Ireland, India and as part of Aden garrison. In 1871, as part of Cardwell reforms, the 62nd was linked with the 99th Regiment of Foot. With the subsequent Childers reforms, the two regiments were amalgamated into a single regiment, the Duke of Edinburgh's (Wiltshire) Regiment, in 1881.

==== 99th Duke of Edinburgh's (Lanarkshire) Regiment of Foot ====
The 99th Regiment of Foot was raised in 1824 in Edinburgh by Major-General Gage John Hall. It was unrelated to earlier units designated as the 99th Regiment of the British Army, including the 99th Regiment of Foot (Jamaica Regiment) and the 99th Foot which was re-designated as the 100th Regiment of Foot. In 1832, the new 99th Regiment received its county title, becoming the 99th (Lanarkshire) Regiment of Foot.

During its early years, the 99th spent much of its time in the Pacific. The first detachments of the 99th Regiment arrived in Australia with convicts transported aboard the transport ship North Briton, destined for Tasmania, in 1842. The rest of the 99th arrived with successive shipments of convicts. The 99th rotated through various colonial posts during much of 1842 until being ordered to Sydney, Australia. However, the 99th soon earned an unsavoury reputation, alienating the locals to such an extent that an additional regiment had to be assigned to Sydney. The 11th Regiment of Foot's principal job was keeping the men of the 99th under control.

The 99th remained in Tasmania for three years before being dispatched to New Zealand to take part in the New Zealand Wars. Detachments of the 99th took part in the Hutt Valley Campaign, seeing action at the Battle of Battle Hill. three government soldiers and at least nine Ngāti Toa were killed. Following the capture of Te Rauparaha in 1846, the Regiment would depart New Zealand and return to Australia, although detachments would be sent as needed to reinforce the British forces in New Zealand for the next few years to keep the peace. For its service in the First Maori War, the regiment earned its first battle honour: New Zealand.

In 1856, the regiment rotated back to the British Isles. The 99th spent its next two years at various garrisons in Ireland, until in 1858, it was ordered to join the Aldershot garrison. While at Aldershot, the regiment earned its reputation as a well drilled and well turned out regiment.

Following its tour of duty at Aldershot, the regiment rotated to India in 1859. After serving at various Indian stations, the 99th was called to active service to form part of General Sir Hope Grant's force during the Second Opium War. Assigned to the 2nd Division, commanded by Major-General Sir Robert Napier, the 99th took part in the Third Battle of Taku Forts and the Battle of Palikao. The regiment also participated in the Sack of Peking, where among the loot carried off, the regiment took a Pekinese dog that belonged to the Chinese Empress. The dog, named Lootie, was taken back to England where it was presented to Queen Victoria. For its service in China, the regiment earned the battle honour: Pekin 1860. Rather than return the 99th to India, the regiment was ordered to join the Hong Kong garrison, securing the new Kowloon territory acquired by the Convention of Peking. The regiment would remain in Hong Kong until 1865.

From 1865 until 1868, the 99th served in South Africa. While there, Prince Alfred, the Duke of Edinburgh, inspected the regiment as part of a tour of the colony. The regiment impressed him so much that he took a continued interest in the regiment for the rest of his life. This culminated in permission being granted to re-title the regiment. In 1874, the 99th (Lanarkshire) Regiment of Foot became the 99th (Duke of Edinburgh's) Regiment. After returning to England in 1868, the regiment returned to South Africa in 1878 in time to take part in the Anglo-Zulu War.

Assigned to Lord Chelmsford's column, they marched to the relief of British forces under Colonel Charles Pearson besieged by the Zulu impis. At the Battle of Gingindlovu, the 99th helped defeat a Zulu impi that tried to overrun the British while laagered. Although it would not participate in the final battle at Ulundi, the 99th was honoured for its service in the Anglo-Zulu War, being awarded the battle honour South Africa 1879.

It would be the last battle honour earned by the 99th as an independent regiment. In 1881, following up on the earlier Cardwell Reforms of 1872, the 99th was merged with the 62nd Regiment of Foot as part of the Childers reforms to the British Army. The new regiment would be known as The Duke of Edinburgh's (Wiltshire Regiment).

=== Service in the Empire ===
Following the amalgamation of the 62nd and 99th regiments into the Duke of Edinburgh (Wiltshire Regiment) in 1881, the regiment rotated through various posts of the British Empire. The 1st battalion was stationed in the Channel Islands from 1886, then transferred to Ireland in 1887. Back home in England from 1893 to 1895, the battalion was sent to British India in 1895. It served in Peshawar until late 1902, when it transferred to Rawalpindi.

The 2nd battalion was posted in India from 1881 to 1895, when the battalion returned. It was on Guernsey at the turn of the century.

=== Second Boer War ===
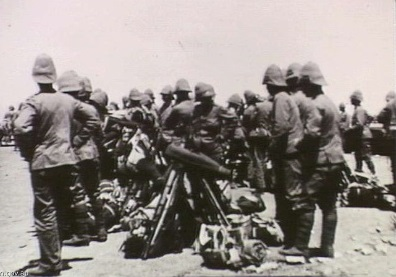
Men of the 2nd Wiltshire Regiment and Tasmanian Imperial Force along the Orange River c. 1900.

In late 1899 the 2nd Wilts was dispatched to South Africa to take part in the Second Boer War. Arriving in time to take part in Lord Roberts' campaign against the Boers. Upon arrival, the 2nd Wilts was brigaded with the 2nd Bedfordshire Regiment, 1st Royal Irish Regiment, and 2nd Worcestershire Regiment to form the 12th Brigade under Major General Clements.

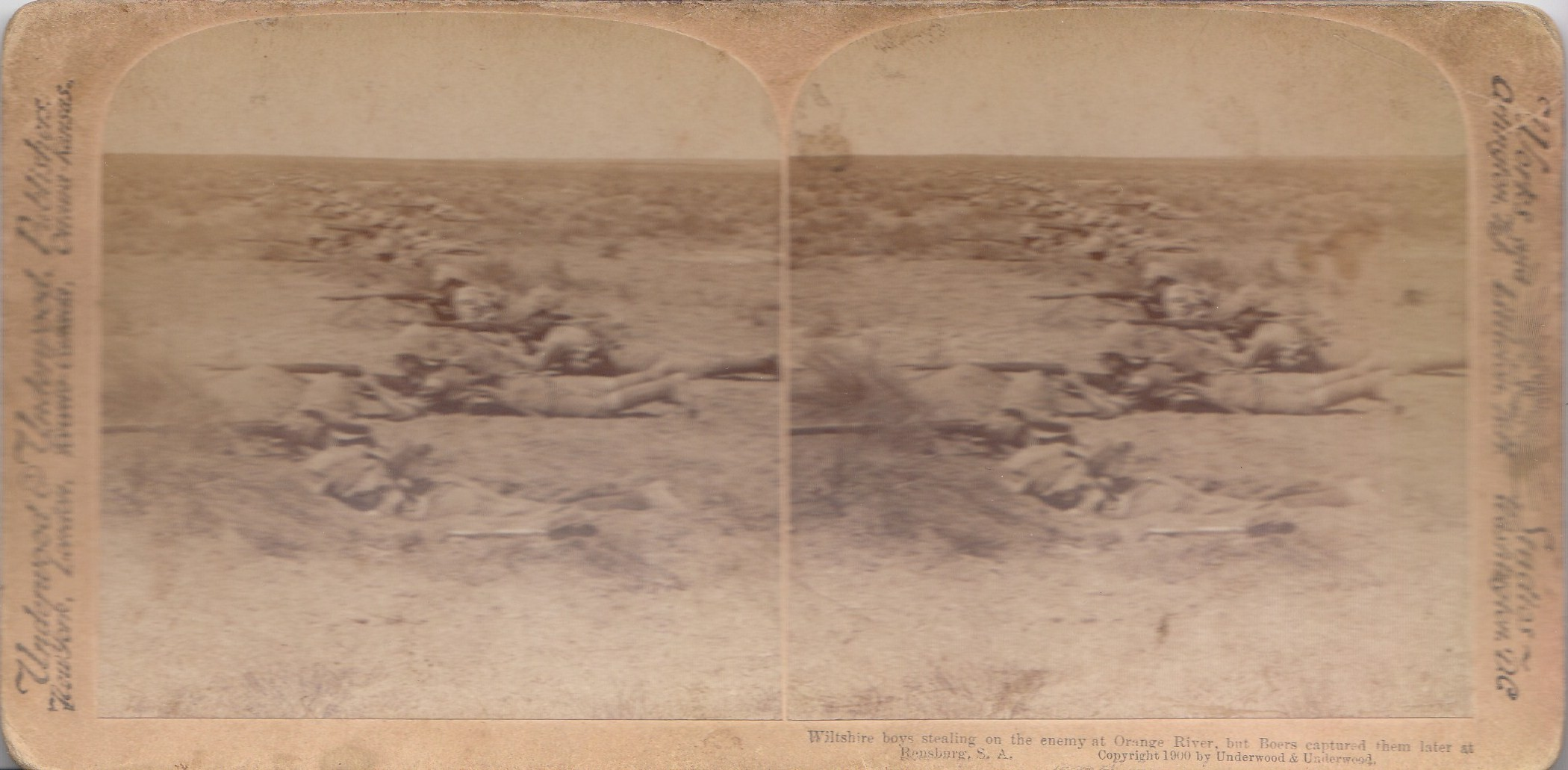
Caption reads, "Wiltshire boys stealing on the enemy at Orange River, but Boers captured them later at Rensburg S.A.". Stereoscope image of the 2nd Wilts in a skirmish line, in the prone firing position, possibly in action, near Rensburg, February 1900.

Although initially assigned to Lieutenant General Kelly-Kenny's Sixth Division, the brigade was used as an independent force. Dispatched to the Colesberg district, they were soon on the defensive against Boer raids once the cavalry under Major-General French were withdrawn to be used to use in the relief of Kimberly. Assigned to garrison an exposed position at the town of Rensburg, the 2nd Wilts lost 14 men killed, 57 wounded, and more than a 100 prisoners taken. Eventually, the brigade commander was forced to pull back the Wiltshires to prevent the Boer Commandos from breaking through and threatening other towns. However, in issuing the order to retreat from Rensburg, two companies of the 2nd Wiltshires, assigned to outpost duty, were never given the word of the retreat. When they tried to re-enter what had been the main camp for the battalion, they found it occupied by the Boers. Although they attempted to escape, the Boer commandos soon caught up with the two companies and, after a fight, forced them to surrender.

Despite losing almost a third of its strength, once Lord Robert's operations began to succeed, the Boer reaction allowed the 12th Brigade, and the 2nd Wilts, to go back on the offensive against the Boer Republics. Although a part of the Sixth Division, the brigade did not take part in the ill-fated attack on Bloody Sunday during the Battle of Paardeberg. Instead, the Wilts was tasked with guarding Bloemfontein and Kroonstad. Eventually, the 12th Brigade was ordered to move in conjunction with another independent brigade and capture the town of Bethlehem, where Christiaan de Wet's commando was operating from. Although the town was taken, De Wet escaped. Pausing to resupply, Clemments' brigade attempted to destroy De Wet's commando at the Battle of Slabbert's Nek (23–24 July 1900). With the Royal Irish Regiment, two companies of the 2nd Wilts conducted a night assault up the Nek, capturing the ridge overlooking the Boer position. Although they cleared the Nek, taking 4000 prisoners, the British forces had not been in time to capture De Wet and some his commando, who managed to escape to the mountains.

After the capture of Bethlehem, the Boer War was moving from its second phase and into the third, guerrilla, phase. The 12th Brigade was broken up and its units sent to other commands. The 2nd Wilts would join Major-General Paget and the West Riding Regiment in patrolling the areas northeast and northwest of Pretoria. After being moved to help block De Wet's attempt to raid the Cape Colony in February 1901, it was assigned to defend the Pretoria-Pietersburg rail line with the 2nd battalion of the Northamptonshire Regiment.

In addition to protecting the Pretoria-Pietersburg line, the 2nd Wilts also contributed four companies of infantry to Lieutenant-Colonel Grenfell's column. Along with the Kitchener Fighting Scouts, 12th Mounted Infantry, and some artillery, left Pietersburg in May 1901. Between May and July 1901, the Wiltshires participated in Grenfell's operations, capturing 229 Boer commandos and 18 wagons.

The combination of the blockhouses, sweeper operations and concentration camps proved to be too much for the Boers. In 1902, the war ended as the last of the Boer commandos surrendered and the Treaty of Vereeniging was signed. With the war over, the 2nd Wiltshires returned to the England in 1903.

The 3rd (Royal Wiltshire Militia) Battalion was embodied in January 1900 for garrison duty at Saint Helena, where a large contingent of Boer prisoners were sent. Following the end of the war in June 1902, most of the officers and men returned home on the SS Dominion, which arrived in Southampton in September.

In 1908, the Volunteers and Militia were reorganised nationally, with the former becoming the Territorial Force and the latter the Special Reserve; the regiment now had one Reserve and one Territorial battalion.

=== The First World War ===
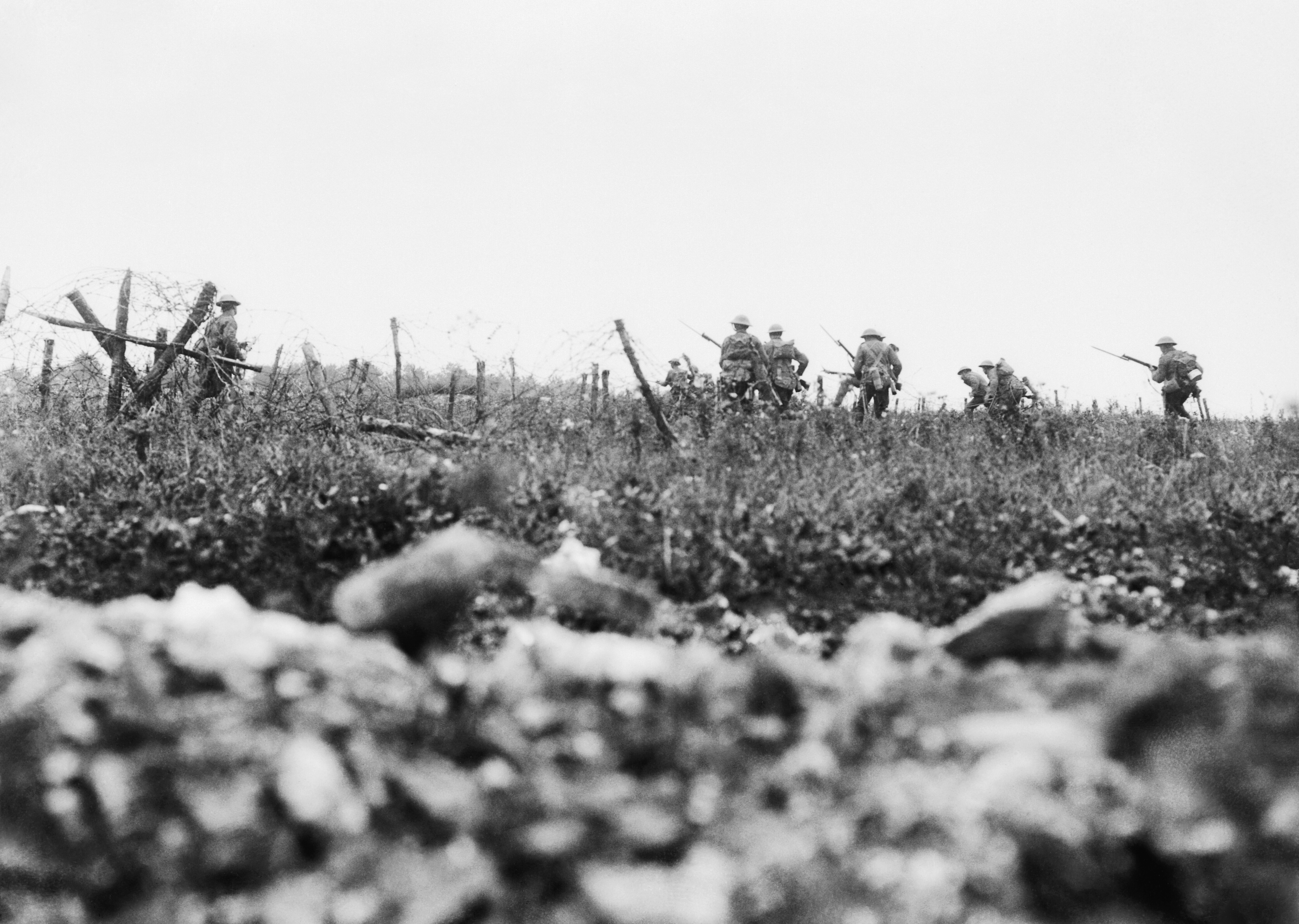
Men of the Wiltshire Regiment attacking near Thiepval, 7 August 1916, during the Battle of the Somme. This could be either 1st Wilts, part of the 25th Division, or 6th Wilts, part of 19th Division. Both battalions were involved in the battles at Pozières and Mouquet Farm. Photo by Ernest Brooks.

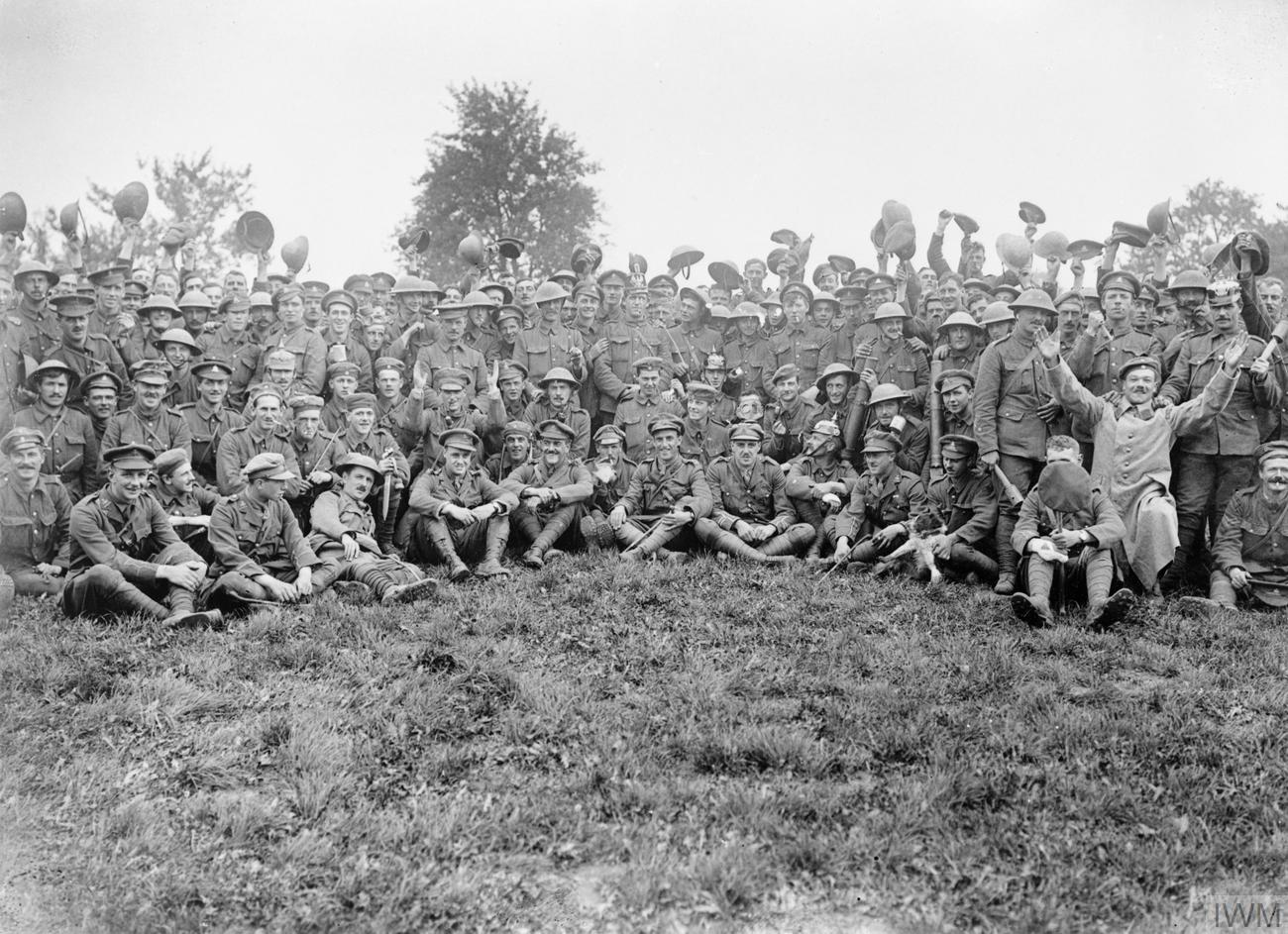
Members of the Wiltshire Regiment after the Battle of Thiepval, c. 1916.

At the start of the First World War, the Duke of Edinburgh's (Wiltshire Regiment), like most of the rest of the British Army, consisted of two regular battalions (the 1st and 2nd); there was also a Special Reserve battalion (3rd) and a Territorial Force battalion. Eventually, the Wiltshire Regiment expanded to ten battalions, seven of which served overseas. These included three additional Territorial Force battalions (1/4th, 2/4th, and 3/4th Battalions) as well as four service battalions (5th, 6th, 7th, and 8th battalions) formed for the Kitchener's New Army formations.

Nearly 5,000 officers and other ranks of the Duke of Edinburgh's (Wiltshire Regiment) had been killed in action or died of wounds sustained during the Great War. 60 battle honours were awarded to the regiment, along with numerous awards for bravery, including a VC.

==== Regular Army battalions ====
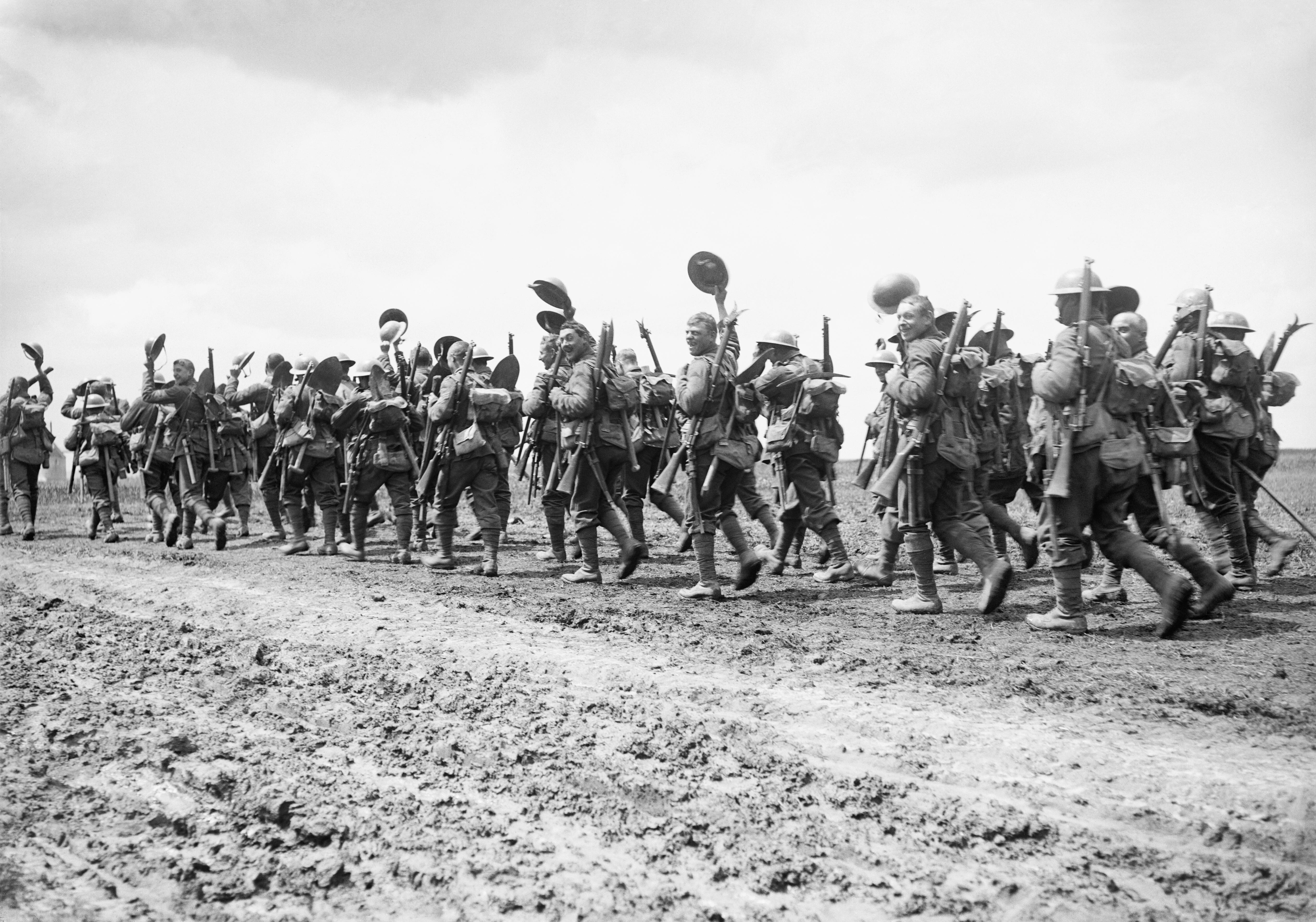
Men of the Wiltshire Regiment marching to the front in 1918. Photo by Ernest Brooks.

Upon mobilization and the declaration of war, the 1st Battalion, Wilts deployed to France as part of the 3rd Division's 7th Brigade, landing in France on 14 August 1914, and soon fought in the Battle of Mons and the Great Retreat and, in October, in the First Battle of Ypres, by which time the battalion had lost 26 officers and over 1,000 other ranks. The 1st Wilts remained on the Western Front with the 3rd Division until the 7th Brigade was transferred to the 25th Division on 18 October 1915. In March 1918 the battalion was involved in Operation Michael, the opening phase of the German Army's Spring Offensive, and subsequently reduced to company strength. It was during this fighting that Acting Captain Reginald Frederick Johnson Hayward MC was awarded the Victoria Cross. The 1st Wilts served with the 25th Division until was transferred on 21 June 1918. On 21 June 1918, the 1st Wilts joined the 110th Brigade, part of the 21st Division, with which it served for the rest of the war.

At the outbreak of war, the 2nd Wilts was serving as part of the Gibraltar Garrison. Recalled home to Britain, the 2nd Wilts was attached to the 21st Brigade, part of the 7th Division. As part of the 21st Brigade, the 2nd Wilts arrived in France in October 1914, in time to take part in the First Ypres, where it suffered heavy casualties in helping to stop the German advance. In December 1915, the 21st Brigade transferred to the 30th Division. In three years of action on the Western Front, the 2nd Wilts took part in most of the major engagements, including the battles of Neuve Chapelle, Aubers, Loos, Albert, Arras and Third Ypres. In March 1918 the 2nd Wilts, like the 1st Wilts, was nearly destroyed during the German Army's Spring Offensive, losing 22 officers and 600 men.

In May 1918, the 2nd Wilts received orders to join the 58th Brigade, part of the 19th (Western) Division. As part of the 19th Division, the 2nd Wilts would see action with the division through the Hundred Days Offensive. In 1919, with the division's disbandment, the 2nd Wilts returned to its pre-war duties of policing the British Empire.

==== Territorial Force and Special Reserve ====
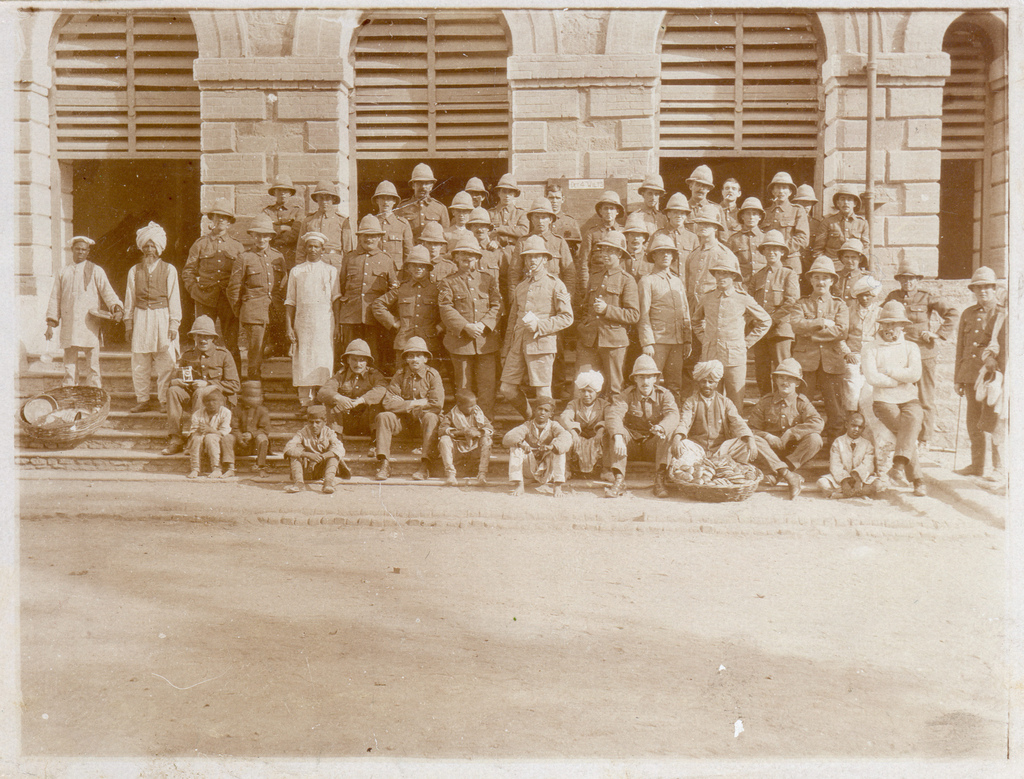
NCO's and enlisted men of the Wiltshire Regiment posing with local Indian civilians sometime in 1916. The soldiers pictured are from either the 1/4th Wilts or 2/4th Wilts, both of which were in British India during this time.

Under the pre-war British Army system, created during the Haldane Reforms, each regiment, in addition to having two regular battalions would have two reserve formations associated with it. One would be a Special Reserve (SR) battalion, while the other would be the Territorial Force units. In the case of the Wiltshire Regiment, the 3rd (Reserve) Battalion was the SR unit. The 3rd Wilts came into active service during 1914. It would remain in the home islands throughout the war. For most of the war, it would act as the depot and training unit for the battalions of the Wiltshire Regiment. In 1917, it moved from the depot at Devizes to join the Portland Garrison in 1915. In 1917, the 3rd Wiltshires would be transferred to the Thames and Medway garrison.

During the war, the Wiltshire's Territorial component would expand from one battalion to three. The 1/4th Wilts was called into service in 1914 as part of the South Western Brigade of the Wessex Division and dispatched to British India. For the next three years, it performed internal security duties in India until being transferred to Egypt in 1917. There it continued to perform security duties until joining the 233rd Brigade, later the 234th Brigade, of the 75th Division, part of the Egyptian Expeditionary Force. While serving with the 75th Division, 1/4th Wilts would see action at the Battle of Megiddo.

The 2/4th Battalion, Wiltshire Regiment came into being in October 1914, assigned to the 2/1st South Western Brigade of the 2nd Wessex Division. Like the 1/4th Wilts, it was also dispatched to British India. However, unlike the 1/4th, 2/4th Wilts never saw action in the First World War. Instead, the battalion took over garrison duties, freeing first-line units up for action against the Central Powers.

The final Territorial Force unit of the Wiltshire Regiment was the 3/4th Battalion. Raised in October 1915, the battalion converted into the 4th Reserve Battalion in April 1916. The battalion remained in the Home Islands throughout the war, finishing the war as part of the Dublin garrison.

==== War service battalions ====
===== 5th (Service) Battalion =====
The 5th (Service) Battalion, Wiltshire Regiment was formed at Devizes in August 1914. Soon thereafter, the battalion was assigned to the 40th Brigade of the 13th (Western) Division, taking the place of the 8th Welsh Regiment. With the rest of the division, it transferred in June 1915 from England to the Mediterranean theatre, joining the Mediterranean Expeditionary Force. Initially assigned to reinforce the forces at Cape Helles on 6 July 1915, the division was temporarily withdrawn and then landed at ANZAC Cove to support the operations there. With the rest of the division, it was withdrawn to Egypt in January 1916 before being dispatched to Mesopotamia as part of the ill-fated attempt to relieve the garrison of Kut.

The battalion remained in Mesopotamia for the rest of war, participating in the recapture of Kut. Once a further offensive was approved, 5th Wilts became one of the first two battalions to cross the Diyalah River, breaking the Turkish defences containing the initial crossing attempt by the 6th (Service) Battalion, Loyal North Lancashire Regiment. Following the Diyala crossing, the battalion participated in the fall of Baghdad, and operations north of there. With the signing of the Armistice, the battalion demobilized in 1919.

===== 6th (Service) Battalion =====
Formed at Devizes in September 1914, the 6th (Service) Battalion was soon assigned to the 19th (Western) Division, eventually being assigned to the 58th Brigade. In July 1915, the battalion was sent to France with the rest of the division. It would see action at the Battle of the Loos, Battle of the Somme, and Third Ypres. Due to losses sustained in Passchendaele campaign in 1917, the 6th Battalion would be amalgamated with the Wiltshire Yeomanry to form the 6th (Royal Wiltshire Yeomanry) battalion on 9 September 1917. Eventually, the battalion would be reduced to cadre strength. The excess personnel would be used as replacements for the 2nd Battalion which assumed its place in the 58th Brigade. The cadre was returned to England on 18 June 1918 and the battalion brought up to strength by absorbing the 9th Battalion, Dorset Regiment.

Now assigned to the 14th (Light) Division, the 6th Wilts became part of the 42nd Brigade. With the rest of the division, it returned to France in July 1918, seeing action in the Battle of Avre.

===== 7th (Service) Battalion =====
Also formed at the Wiltshire Regiment's depot in Devizes in September 1914, the 7th (Service) Battalion was part of the Third New Army (or K3) of Kitchener's scheme. Soon after formation, the battalion became part of the 79th Brigade, assigned to the 26th Division. In September 1915, the division was transferred to France before being reassigned to the Mediterranean as part of the British forces fighting in Salonika. As part of the division, the battalion was engaged in the Battle of Horseshoe Hill in 1916, and First and Second Battles of Dorian in 1916 and 1917.

In June 1918, the 7th Wilts transferred to France, arriving there in July 1918. After the German spring offensives, many divisions needed be rebuilt with fresh battalions to replace those decimated by the German offensives. Once in theatre, 7th Wilts was assigned to the 150th Brigade of the 50th (Northumbrian) Division. As part of the 50th Division, the battalion took part in the October 1918 battles, including Battle of St. Quentin Canal, the Battle of the Beaurevoir Line, and the Battle of Cambrai during the Hundred Days Offensive.

===== 8th (Service) Battalion =====
Formed from volunteers at Weymouth in November 1914, the 8th (Service) Battalion was part of Kitchener's Fourth New Army. Originally assigned to the 102nd Brigade, 34th Division, the War Office decided to convert the battalion into a reserve battalion. Eventually in September 1916, the battalion was absorbed into the 8th Reserve Brigade at Wareham. The battalion never deployed overseas.

=== Between the wars ===
In 1921, the regiment was retitled as the Wiltshire Regiment (Duke of Edinburgh's). The regiment's two regular battalions returned to policing the British Empire. The 1st Battalion would serve as part of the Dublin garrison during the Irish War of Independence. After the treaty, the 1st Battalion would see service in Egypt in 1930 and Shanghai in 1931. The battalion was then made part of the Singapore garrison in 1932, where it would remain for four years. In 1936, the battalion would be assigned to India.

Following the Great War, the 2nd Battalion was sent to Hong Kong. In 1921, the battalion began nine years as part of Indian Army. The battalion became part of the Shanghai garrison in 1929 before being rotated back to the Home Islands in 1933. The 2nd Battalion was dispatched to join the British Forces policing the Mandatory Palestine. The battalion served there during the 1936–1939 Arab revolt in Palestine.

=== The Second World War ===
In the Second World War, the Wiltshire Regiment (Duke of Edinburgh's) lost 1,045 officers and other ranks killed in action or from wounds sustained and were awarded 34 Battle honours.

==== Regular Army battalions ====
At the start of the Second World War, the Wiltshire Regiment found its two Regular Army battalions stationed in British India (1st Battalion) and Palestine (2nd Battalion). Eventually two more battalions would be raised for the war. The 1st Battalion remained in British India, performing internal security duties at the outset of the war. During the reorganization of the Burma front in 1943, the battalion became responsible for guarding the lines of communications and support for the Arakan offensive as part of the Eastern Army. The 1st Battalion, Wiltshires were transferred to the 4th Indian Infantry Brigade, which also included the 3rd Battalion, 9th Gurkha Rifles and 8th Battalion, 8th Punjab Regiment, part of 26th Indian Infantry Division, in October 1943. With the 26th Indian Division, the 1st Wiltshires took part in the Battle of the Admin Box. Before General Slim's offensive to recapture Burma, 1st Wiltshires were rotated back to serve along the North-West Frontier.

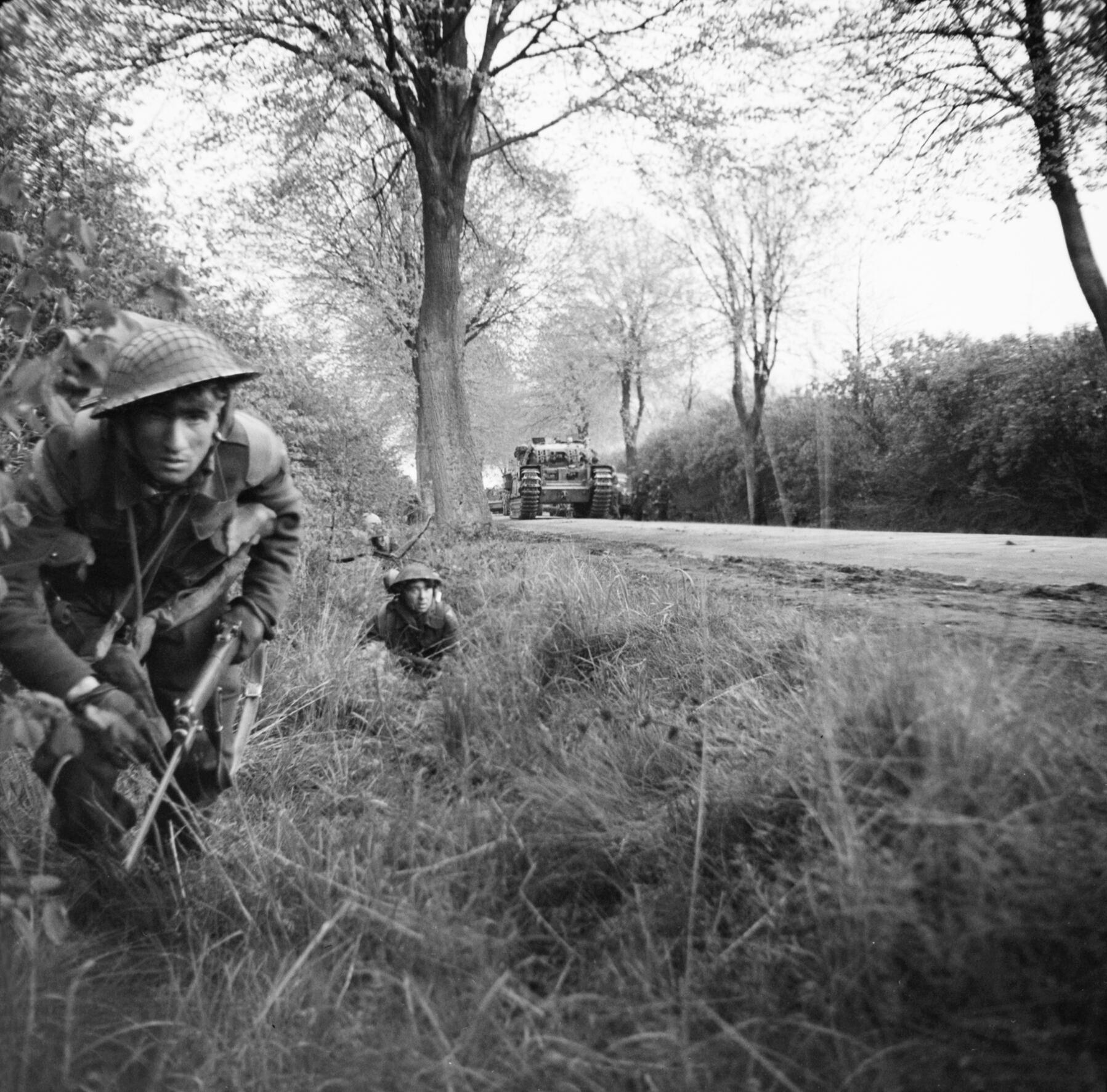
Infantrymen of the 2nd Battalion, Wiltshire Regiment, supported by Churchill tanks of the 6th Guards Tank Brigade, clear a pocket of resistance south of Lubeck, Germany, 2 May 1945.

The 2nd Battalion, Wiltshire Regiment, began the war as part of the 13th Infantry Brigade, which also included 2nd Cameronians (Scottish Rifles) and 2nd Royal Inniskilling Fusiliers (later 5th Essex Regiment), part of the 5th Infantry Division of the British Expeditionary Force in France. The battalion fought in a series of engagements during the Battle of France in May 1940, most notably at the Battle of Arras. After being evacuated at Dunkirk, the 2nd Wiltshires participated in Operation Ironclad, the capture of Vichy-held Madagascar, known as the Battle of Madagascar. On 19 May the Battalion re-embarked on the Franconia to sail to India to rejoin the 5th Division and were stationed in Bombay and Ahmednagar until August. The Wiltshires, as well as the rest of the brigade, were then sent to the Middle East. As part of 13th Infantry Brigade, the Wiltshires spent the end of 1942 until early part of 1943 operating in Iraq, Persia, Syria and Palestine, under Middle East Command. Later, the brigade participated in Operation Husky, the invasion of Sicily, and the follow-on invasion of the Italian mainland in September 1943. During the Italian Campaign, the 2nd Wiltshires would win battle honours for its actions, taking part in the Moro River Campaign and later crossing the Garigliano river in January 1944. From March until late May, the battalion fought in the Battle of Anzio, enduring terrible conditions and fighting in trench warfare, similar to that on Western Front nearly 30 years before. They later fought in the breakout from the Anzio beachhead, Operation Diadem and the subsequent capture of Rome. On 3 June 1944 Sergeant Maurice Albert Windham Rogers was posthumously awarded the Victoria Cross, the first and only to be awarded to the regiment during the Second World War. Eventually the battalion, as well as the rest of the brigade and the 5th Division would be withdrawn from the Italian Campaign and sent to Palestine, where they would remain for the rest of the year, training and absorbing replacements, mainly from anti-aircraft gunners retrained as infantrymen. However, the 5th Division instead joined the British Second Army, at the time fighting on the Western Front, to participate in the final drive into Germany in April 1945. They took part in the Elbe River crossing as well as the encirclement of Army Group B. When hostilities ended on 8 May 1945, they were at Lübeck on the Baltic Sea. The Battalion moved to Einbeck on 1 July and settled down to occupation duties. As the official history reads, "So ended a journey of over 25,000 miles through nearly six years of war."

==== Territorial and war service battalions ====
In addition to the two regular army battalions, the Wiltshire Regiment (Duke of Edinburgh's) raised four other battalions before and during the war. Two of these would be used on foreign service (4th and 5th Territorial battalions), while the other two remained in the United Kingdom as home defence or as training units (6th and 50th Territorial battalions).

The 4th and 5th Battalions of the Wiltshire Regiment were both Territorial Army (TA) units called up to active duty with the start of the Second World War. The 4th Battalion, Wilts had been the original Territorial battalion when the Territorial Army was reorganized during the early 1920s. The 5th Battalion, Wiltshire Regiment was formed on 25 March 1939 as the 2nd Line duplicate of the 4th Battalion as part of the expansion of the Territorials in throughout 1939 when another European conflict seemed increasingly likely. From 1939 to 1944, both units remained in England training, both attached to 129th Infantry Brigade, alongside the 4th Somerset Light Infantry, part of the excellent 43rd (Wessex) Infantry Division. Although the 5th Battalion was a 2nd Line Territorial unit, it was assigned to a 1st Line brigade and division. This was because the 43rd Division and its 2nd Line duplicate, the 45th, was not formed as an exact mirror duplicate as most were, but was instead split on a geographical basis, with all the units from Wiltshire, Hampshire and Dorset being assigned to the 43rd, whereas those from Devonshire, Somerset and Cornwall assigned to the 45th.

As part of the 129th Brigade, both the 4th and 5th Wiltshires participated in the Battle of Normandy, landing in France on 24 June 1944. On arrival in theatre, the division became part of Lieutenant-General Sir Richard O'Connor's VIII Corps. Both battalions would be heavily engaged in many battles during the campaign across North-West France, the low countries, and Germany. During the Normandy Campaign, this included the Battle of Odom, the fight for Hill 112 (Operation Jupiter), and the capture of Mont Picon.

After the breakout from Normandy, the 5th Wiltshires would be one of the first two British battalions to force a crossing of the Seine River. On 25 August 1944, it, along with the 4th Battalion, Somerset Light Infantry, crossed the Seine in paddled assault boats. Once across, the 5th Wiltshires had to hold-off a counter-attack from the German forces including three Tiger tanks. Because of an error in landing on an island in the Seine, rather than the far shore, by the other battalion, the 4th Somerset Light Infantry, the 5th Wilts found themselves cutoff initially. Despite the heavy counter-attack from the German defenders, the 5th Wiltshires were able to hold and extend the beachhead enough to allow reinforcements to be brought over. Eventually, by daybreak on 26 August 1944, the Somersets were reembarked and brought to the right landing site. The 4th Wilts were ferried over while elements of the 214th Infantry Brigade, also a part of 43rd (Wessex) Division, managed to cross at a damaged bridge in order to relieve the 5th Wilts.

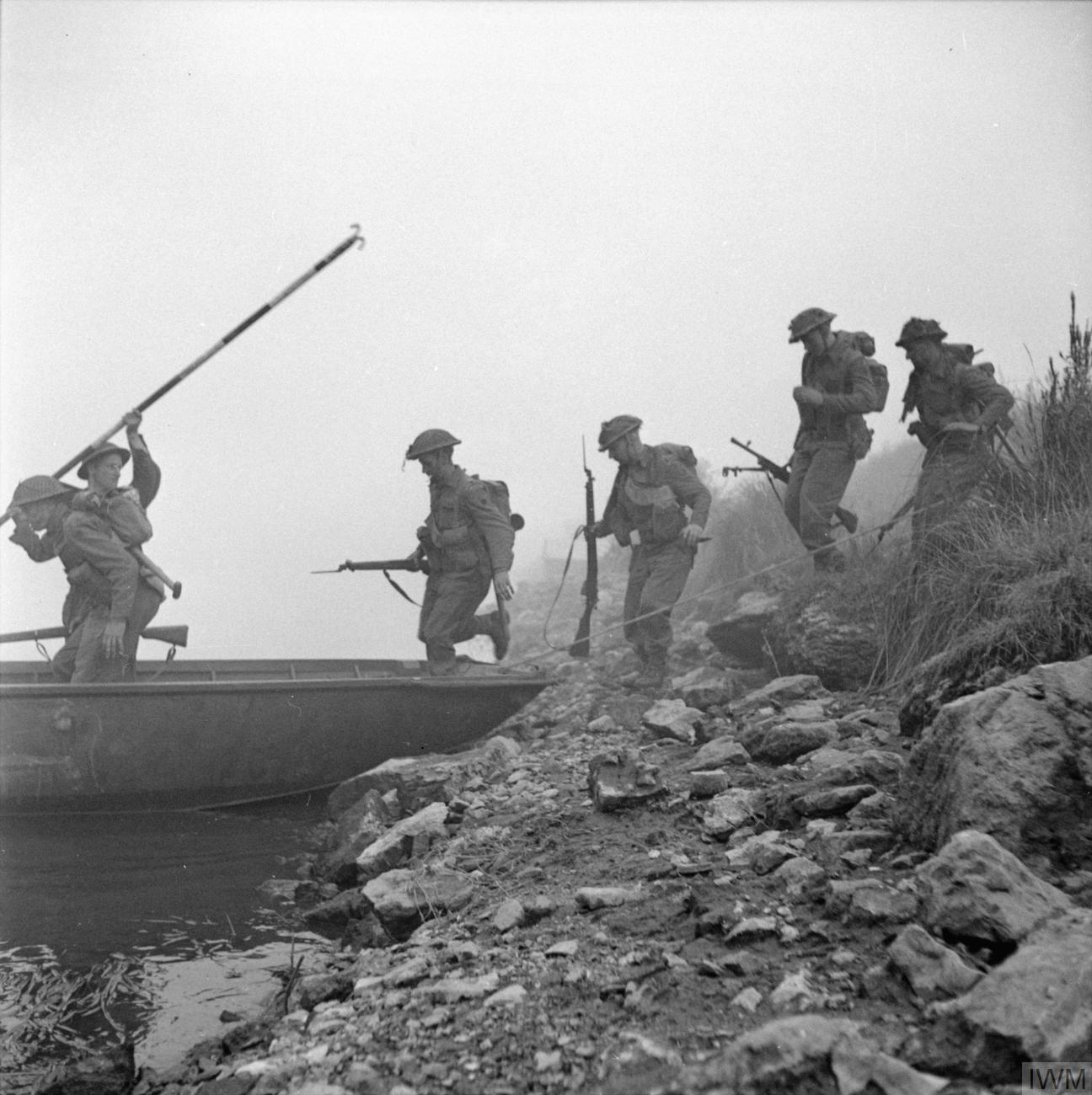
Men of the 4th Battalion, Wiltshire Regiment climb into an assault boat to cross the Seine at Vernon, France, 25 August 1944.

During Operation Market Garden, the 4th and 5th Wiltshires formed part of the relief force that tried to reach the airborne troops of the US 82nd and 101st Airborne Divisions, as well as the British 1st Airborne Division fighting at Arnhem. After the failure of Market Garden and the defeat of the German counter offensive, both battalions participated in the Geilenkirchen Offensive in October 1944. Both battalions also played a significant part in the 43rd division's fighting in the Roer Salient, as well as the capture of Bremen. By VE-Day and the end of the war in Europe both battalions had suffered heavy casualties; 4th Wilts had suffered 19 officers and 213 other ranks killed in action and the 5th Wilts had 334 killed in action, including 21 officers, with a further 1,277 wounded or missing. "The final attritional scenes" of From the City, From the Plough by Alexander Baron (1948, republished by the Imperial War Museum in 2019) describe the 5th Wiltshire's near annihilation at Mont Pincon, represented by the fictitious 5th Battalion, Wessex Regiment.

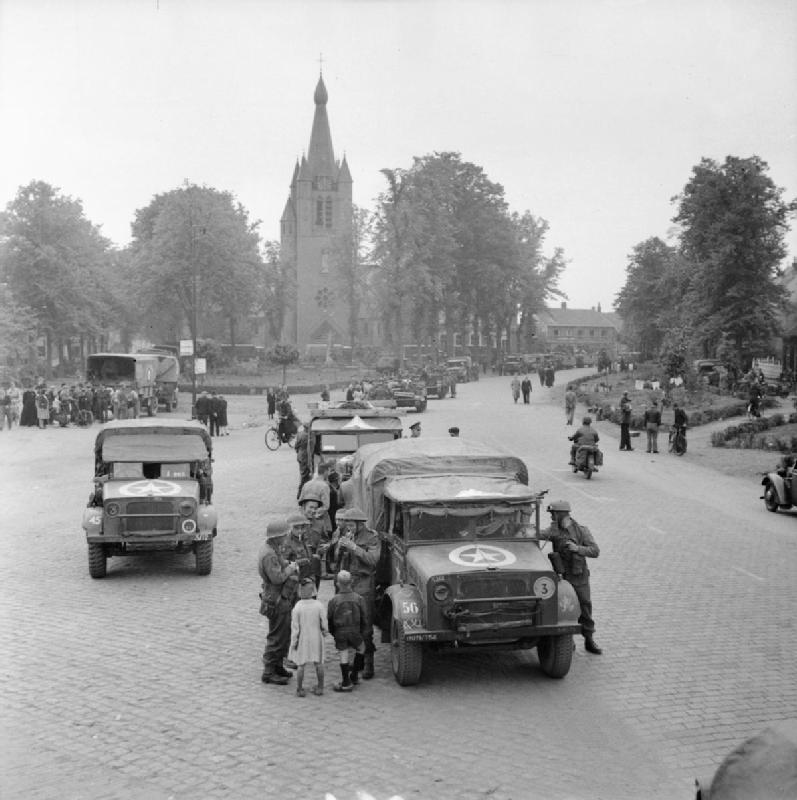
Bedford MWB trucks and members of the 4th Battalion, Wiltshire Regiment, of 129th Brigade of 43rd (Wessex) Division, in Valkenswaard during Operation Market Garden, 21 September 1944.

The 6th (Home Defence) Battalion was formed after the outbreak of hostilities in 1939. In 1941, the battalion was redesignated as the 30th Battalion; however, it remained in the United Kingdom in the home defence role.

The 50th (Holding) Battalion was formed in 1940. However, later that year, it was redesignated as the 7th Battalion and was assigned to the 214th Independent Infantry Brigade (Home). Although it was a war service battalion, the 7th Wiltshires remained in Great Britain as part of the home defence forces. Initially assigned to the 214th Infantry Brigade, formed with other war-raised units, it would be transferred to 135th Infantry Brigade, 45th Infantry Division in 1942. The 7th Wiltshires would not see active service during the war and remained in the United Kingdom, supplying the front-line units with trained infantrymen and was apparently disbanded in August 1944, sending a huge draft of replacements to the 4th and 5th battalions.

=== Post-war and amalgamation ===
As part of Britain's post-war reduction, each infantry regiment was required to reduce its strength by one battalion. In the case of the Wiltshire Regiment, this meant amalgamating the 1st and 2nd battalions. This was done on 10 January 1949, while the regiment was part of the British Army of the Rhine. For the remainder of its existence, the Wiltshires would remain a one battalion regiment.

After the end of the Second World War, the Wiltshire regiment would add one more campaign to its list. Although initially earmarked to be sent to Malaya during the Emergency, the Wilt's orders were changed en route and they joined the Hong Kong garrison in 1950. After returning home to Britain in 1953, the Wilts were ready for foreign service once more. The Wilts final campaign as an independent regiment came in 1956, when it deployed to Cyprus as reinforcements for the British garrison during the Cyprus Emergency. The battalion, deployed in response to EOKA attacks which escalated in 1955, remained on Cyprus until its amalgamation in 1959. The Wiltshire Regiment would be amalgamated with The Royal Berkshire Regiment (Princess Charlotte of Wales's) to form The Duke Of Edinburgh's Royal Regiment (Berkshire and Wiltshire) on 9 June 1959. The ceremony took place at Albany Barracks, Parkhurst on the Isle of Wight.

== Regimental museum ==
The Rifles Berkshire and Wiltshire Museum is based in Salisbury.

== Battle honours ==
The regiment's battle honours were as follows:

- Seven Years' War: Louisburg 1758 (Awarded 1910)
- Peninsula War: Nive; Peninsula
- First Sikh War 1845–1846: Ferozeshah
- 1st Maori War, New Zealand 1845–1847: New Zealand
- Crimean War 1854–1856: Sevastopol
- Second China War 1856-60: Pekin 1860
- South Africa and the Zulu War 1877–79: South Africa 1879
- Anglo-Boer War 1899–1902: South Africa 1900–1902
- The Great War 1914–1918: Mons; Messines 1914, 1917, 1918; Ypres 1914, 1917; Somme 1916, 1918; Arras 1917; Bapaume 1918; Macedonia 1915–18; Gallipoli 1915–16; Palestine 1917–18; Baghdad. Le Cateau; Retreat from Mons; Marne 1914; Aisne 1914, 1918; La Bassée 1914; Armentières 1914; Langemarck 1914; Nonne Bosschen; Neuve Chapelle; Aubers; Festubert 1915; Loos; Albert 1916, 1918; Pozières; Le Transloy; Ancre Heights; Ancre 1916; Scarpe 1917; Pilckem; Menin Road; Polygon Wood; Broodseinde; Poelcapelle; Passchendaele; St Quentin; Lys; Bailleul; Kemmel; Scherpenberg; Hindenburg Line; Epéhy; Canal du Nord; St Quentin Canal; Beaurevoir; Cambrai 1918; Selle; Sambre; France and Flanders 1914-18; Doiran 1917; Suvla; Sari Bair; Gaza; Nebi Samwil; Jerusalem; Megiddo; Sharon; Tigris 1916; Kut al Amara 1917; Mesopotamia 1916-18.
- Second World War 1939–1945: Defence of Arras; Hill 112; Maltot; Mont Pinçon; Seine 1944; Cleve; Garigliano Crossing; Anzio; Rome; North Arakan. Ypres-Comines Canal; Odon; Caen; Bourguébus Ridge; La Varinière; Nederrijn; Roer; Rhineland; Goch; Xanten; Rhine; Bremen; North-West Europe 1940, 1944–5; Solarino; Simeto Bridgehead; Sicily 1943; Minturno; Advance to Tiber; Italy 1943–4; Middle East 1942; Point 551; Mayu Tunnels; Ngakyedauk Pass; Burma 1943–4.

== Victoria Crosses ==
The following members of the Regiment were awarded the Victoria Cross:

- Captain Reginald Frederick Johnson Hayward VC, MC & Bar: 1st Battalion—21/22 March 1918
- Sergeant Maurice Albert Windham Rogers VC, MM: 2nd Battalion—3 June 1944 (posthumous)

== Regimental traditions and nicknames ==
In honour of the sergeants who took command of the regiment during the Battle of Ferozeshah, 21 December was a regimental anniversary of the 62nd (Wiltshire) Regiment of Foot. When amalgamated with the 99th Duke of Edinburgh's (Lanarkshire) Regiment of Foot in 1881, the anniversary was incorporated into the new The Duke of Edinburgh's (Wiltshire Regiment). Each 21st of the December, the regiment's colours would be passed to the keeping of the non-commissioned officers for 24 hours. This tradition continued through its descendants, the 1st Battalion, Royal Gloucestershire, Berkshire and Wiltshire Regiment until it too was amalgamated to form part of The Rifles.

The Wiltshire Regiment was also known as the Wilts, The Splashers, The Springers, and The Moonrakers. The earliest nickname may have been the Splashers. This name came about from an incident during the Seven Years' War when the regiment ran out of ammunition and were forced to melt their buttons down to make musket balls. Thereafter, their buttons had a dent, known as a "splash", in them. The next name, The Springers, came from the regiment being used in the light infantry role during the American Revolution. A common command for light infantry to advance while skirmishing, was to "spring up". The nickname Moonrakers came from the Wiltshire region itself. According to a local legend, customs officials had come across some yokels raking a pond to retrieve some kegs of alcohol. The men explained themselves by pointing to the reflection of the moon in the water and claiming they were trying to retrieve the roundel of cheese there. Hence the name, "Moonrakers". When the regiment was affiliated with Wiltshire, the nickname followed.

The second battalion of the Wiltshire Regiment (formerly the 99th Regiment of Foot) brought its own nicknames with them when the regiments were amalgamated in 1881. During its time as a separate regiment, the 99th Foot was known for the smartness of its drill. This earned it an assignment guarding Queen Victoria's pavilion during a tour of duty at Osbourne House, Isle of Wight in 1858. As a result, the 99th became known as the "Queen's Pets". It is also said that the expression "dressed to the nines" originated as a reference to the 99th. As part of their drill, their uniforms were kept in immaculate condition, which other regiments attempted to emulate, or dressing to the nines.

== Lineage ==
Lineage
| The Wiltshire Regiment (Duke of Edinburgh's) | 62nd (Wiltshire) Regiment of Foot |
| The Wiltshire Regiment (Duke of Edinburgh's) | 99th (Lanarkshire) Regiment of Foot |

== See also ==
- The Vly be on the Turmut

== Sources ==
- Saunders, T. (2006) [2001]. Hill 112: Battles of the Odon 1944. Battleground Europe: Normandy (Pen & Sword ed.). Leo Cooper. ISBN 0-85052-737-6.
