= 129th Infantry Brigade (United Kingdom) =

South Western Brigade 129th (South Western) Brigade 129th Infantry Brigade
- Active: 1908-1919; 1920-1946; 1947-1968
- Country: United Kingdom
- Branch: Territorial Army
- Type: Infantry
- Size: Brigade
- Part of: 43rd (Wessex) Infantry Division
- Engagements: Operation Overlord; Operation Market Garden; Battle of the Bulge; Operation Blackcock; Operation Veritable

Commanders
- Notable commanders: Sir Charles Bonham-Carter

The 129th Infantry Brigade was an infantry brigade of the British Army that served during both the First and Second World Wars. In both wars the brigade was part of 43rd (Wessex) Infantry Division.

== History ==
=== Formation ===
The brigade was originally formed in 1908 in the Territorial Force (TF) as the South Western Brigade attached to the Wessex Division. It was composed of four TF infantry battalions, the 4th and 5th of the Prince Albert's (Somerset Light Infantry), the 4th Battalion of the Dorsetshire Regiment, and the 4th Battalion of the Duke of Edinburgh's (Wiltshire Regiment).

=== First World War ===
The division was mobilised in August 1914, shortly after the outbreak of the First World War. The division was sent overseas to India to free up Regular Army troops for service on the Western Front in France and Belgium. In 1915 the division was numbered as the 43rd (Wessex) Division and the brigade became the 129th (1/1st South Western) Brigade. (The 2nd Welsh Brigade, raised for 'Kitchener's Army' by the Welsh National Executive Committee, had received the number '129th' on 10 December 1914, but it had been renumbered 114th Brigade on 27 April 1915.) However, the division, and the brigade, never saw action and were disbanded later in the war but many of the division's units saw service with mainly British Indian Army brigades and divisions.

==== First World War order of battle ====
- 1/4th Battalion, Prince Albert's (Somerset Light Infantry) (until February 1916)
- 1/5th Battalion, Prince Albert's (Somerset Light Infantry) (until May 1917)
- 1/4th Battalion, Dorsetshire Regiment (until February 1916)
- 1/4th Battalion, Duke of Edinburgh's (Wiltshire Regiment) (until September 1917)

=== Between the wars ===
The Territorial Force was disbanded shortly after the end of the Great War. It was, however, reformed as the Territorial Army in 1920 and both the 43rd Division and the brigade were also reformed. The brigade was now known as 129th (South Western) Infantry Brigade, composed of the same battalions it had before the Great War and this was the composition of the brigade for most of the inter-war years.

In 1938 all infantry brigades were reduced from four to three battalions and so, as a result, the 4th Battalion, Dorset Regiment was transferred to the 128th (Hampshire) Infantry Brigade. In 1939 the brigade was redesignated as 129th Infantry Brigade and the 4th Dorsets was transferred to the 130th Infantry Brigade. In the same year, the 5th Battalion, Wiltshire Regiment, formed as a 2nd Line duplicate of the 4th Wilts when the Territorials were doubled in size, also joined the brigade and the 5th Battalion, Somerset Light Infantry was transferred to 135th Infantry Brigade, part of 45th (Wessex) Infantry Division, which was formed as a 2nd Line duplicate of the 43rd (Wessex).

=== Second World War ===
The brigade served with the division throughout the Second World War and spent from 1939 until June 1944 in intensive training throughout the United Kingdom, particularly in Kent. They were training for the invasion of France and landed in Normandy in late June 1944. They fought in the Normandy Campaign, Operation Market Garden, the Battle of the Bulge and the Rhine Crossing.

==== Order of battle ====
- 4th Battalion, Somerset Light Infantry
- 4th Battalion, Wiltshire Regiment
- 5th Battalion, Wiltshire Regiment
- 129th Infantry Brigade Anti-Tank Company (formed 14 May 1940, disbanded 20 December 1941)

==== Commanders ====
- Brig. G.E.M. Whittuck
- Brig. W.K.M. Leader
- Brig. G. Brunskill (11 March 1941–11th Aug.1942)
- Brig. G.H.L. Mole
- Brig. J.O.E. Vandeleur
- Brig. W.R. Cox

=== Postwar ===
The TA was reconstituted from 1 January 1947 and its units and formations including 43 (Wessex) Infantry Division were reformed. 129 Brigade then had the following organisation:

- 4th Battalion, Somerset Light Infantry at Bath, Somerset
- 5th Battalion, Gloucestershire Regiment at Gloucester
- 4th Battalion, Wiltshire Regiment at Trowbridge

== See also ==
- 135th (2/1st South Western) Brigade for the 2nd Line formation
- British infantry brigades of the First World War
- British brigades of the Second World War
