= The Vly be on the Turmut =

English folk song

"The Vly be on the Turmut" (i.e. "The Fly is on the Turnip") (Roud 1376), also called "The Turmut Hoer", is an English folk song, and is the unofficial song of the English county of Wiltshire, sung in the Wiltshire dialect.

The song is one of the regimental marching songs of the Wiltshire Regiment. According to a long-established Salisbury tradition, the city's Member of Parliament sings the song from the balcony of the White Hart Hotel in St John's Street after winning each Parliamentary election.

The musical score is given in Tom Gibson's The Wiltshire Regiment and in Granville Bantock's 100 Songs of England for High Voice.

The song also appears with variations in Oxfordshire and Gloucestershire. The BBC's Music Library contains seven editions of the versions from the three counties.

== Lyrics ==
T'were on a jolly zummer's day, the twenty-vust o' May,
John Scruggins took his turmut 'oe, wi' this 'e trudged away,
Now some volkes they loike haymakin', and some they vancies mowin'
But of all the jobs as Oi loike best, gi'e Oi the turmut 'oein'.

The vly, the vly,
The vly be on the turmut,
'Tis all me eye,
For Oi to try,
To keep vlies off them turmuts.

The vust place as Oi went to wurk; it were wi' Varmer Gower,
Who vowed and swore as 'ow Oi were a vust class turmut 'oer;
The second place Oi went to wurk, they paid Oi by the job,
If Oi'd a-knowed a little more, Oi'd sooner bin in quod.

The vly, the vly,
The vly be on the turmut,
'Tis all me eye,
For Oi to try,
To keep vlies off them turmuts.

The last place as Oi went to wurk, they zent ver Oi a-mowin',
Oi zent wurd back, Oi'd zunner get the zack, than gi'e up turmut 'oein'.
Now all you jolly varmer chaps, what boides at 'ome zo warm,
Oi'll now conclude my ditty wi'e a-wishin' you no 'arm.

The vly, the vly,
The vly be on the turmut,
'Tis all me eye,
For Oi to try,
To keep vlies off them turmuts.

=== The Turmit Hower ===
A version entitled "The Turmut Hower" was printed in 1918 and opens with the lines

"I be a turmut hower,
Vram Gloucestershire I came;
My parents be hard-working folk,
Giles Wapshaw be my name."
