= 135th (2/1st South Western) Brigade =

2nd/1st South Western Brigade 135th (2/1st South Western) Brigade 135th Infantry Brigade
- Active: October 1914 – 1919; April 1939 – July 1944; September 1944 – March 1946
- Country: United Kingdom
- Branch: Territorial Force; Territorial Army
- Type: Infantry
- Size: Brigade
- Part of: 45th (2nd Wessex) Division; 45th Infantry Division
- Service: First World War; Second World War

The 135th Infantry Brigade was an infantry brigade of the Territorial Force, part of the British Army. It was formed in the First World War as a duplicate of the South Western Brigade and was originally formed as the 2nd/1st South Western Brigade in 1914–1915 before later being renamed as the 135th (2/1st South Western) Brigade. It was sent overseas to India in December 1914 to relieve Regular Army units for service in France. The brigade remained there for the rest of the war, supplying drafts of replacements to the British units fighting in the Middle East and later complete battalions.

It was reformed as 135th Infantry Brigade in the Territorial Army in 1939, again as a duplicate formation, when another European conflict with Germany seemed inevitable. During the Second World War, the brigade was active in the United Kingdom throughout its service. It was disbanded on 20 July 1944.

The brigade was reformed on 1 September 1944 as part of the 45th (Holding) Division. It did not see service outside the United Kingdom during the war.

== History ==
=== First World War ===
In accordance with the Territorial and Reserve Forces Act 1907 (7 Edw. 7, c.9) which brought the Territorial Force into being, the TF was intended to be a home defence force for service during wartime and members could not be compelled to serve outside the country. However, on the outbreak of war on 4 August 1914, many members volunteered for Imperial Service. Therefore, TF units were split into 1st Line (liable for overseas service) and 2nd Line (home service for those unable or unwilling to serve overseas) units. 2nd Line units performed the home defence role, although in fact most of these were also posted abroad in due course.

On 15 August 1915, TF units were instructed to separate home service men from those who had volunteered for overseas service (1st Line), with the home service personnel to be formed into reserve units (2nd Line). On 31 August, 2nd Line units were authorized for each 1st Line unit where more than 60% of men had volunteered for overseas service. After being organized, armed and clothed, the 2nd Line units were gradually grouped into large formations thereby forming the 2nd Line brigades and divisions. These 2nd Line units and formations had the same name and structure as their 1st Line parents. On 24 November, it was decided to replace imperial service (1st Line) formations as they proceeded overseas with their reserve (2nd Line) formations. A second reserve (3rd Line) unit was then formed at the peace headquarters of the 1st Line.

The brigade was formed as a 2nd Line duplicate of the South Western Brigade in October 1914, shortly after the outbreak of war. It was assigned to the 2nd Wessex Division, the 2nd Line duplicate of the Wessex Division. The division was selected for service in India thereby releasing British and Indian regular battalions for service in Europe. On 12 December, the brigade embarked at Southampton and landed at Bombay between 4 and 8 January.

The brigade was effectively broken up on arrival in India; the units reverted to peacetime conditions and the battalions were dispersed to Bangalore, Meiktila (Burma), Ahmednagar, and Poona. The Territorial Force divisions and brigades were numbered in May 1915 in the order that they departed for overseas service, starting with the 42nd (East Lancashire) Division. The 2nd Wessex Division should have been numbered as the 45th (2nd Wessex) Division, but as the division had already been broken up, this was merely a place holder. Likewise, the 2nd/1st South Western Brigade was notionally numbered as 135th (2/1st South Western) Brigade.

The units pushed on with training to prepare for active service, handicapped by the need to provide experienced manpower for active service units. By early 1916 it had become obvious that it would not be possible to transfer the division and brigade to the Western Front as originally intended. Nevertheless, individual units proceeded overseas on active service through the rest of the war. The 2/4th Somerset Light Infantry and 2/4th Dorsets served in the Sinai and Palestine Campaign from September 1917, so that by the end of the war just the 2/5th Somerset Light Infantry and 2/4th Wilts remained in India.

==== First World War units ====
The brigade commanded the following units:

- 2/4th Battalion, Prince Albert's (Somerset Light Infantry) was formed at Bath in September 1914 and went to India with the brigade, arriving at Bombay between 4 and 8 January 1915. It was posted to Bangalore in 9th (Secunderabad) Division until September 1915 when it was sent to the Andaman Islands. It returned to India in January 1916 and served successively with the Presidency Brigade, 8th (Lucknow) Division (to May 1917), at Lahore in 3rd Lahore Divisional Area (to August), Poona Brigade, 6th Poona Divisional Area (to September). It landed at Suez on 25 September 1917 and joined the 232nd Brigade, 75th Division at Deir el Balah on 16 October. On 2 May 1918, the battalion embarked at Port Said for service on the Western Front, disembarking at Marseille on 1 June. It joined the 34th Division at Berthen on 19 June and became the division's pioneer battalion on 5 July (reorganized as three companies). At the Armistice with Germany on 11 November it was still the 34th Division pioneers and was at Wevelgham, west of Courtrai, Belgium.
- 2/5th Battalion, Prince Albert's (Somerset Light Infantry) was formed at Taunton in September 1914. It went to India with the brigade arriving at Bombay between 4 and 8 January 1915 and remained in India and India and Burma throughout the war. It served in the Burma Division at Meiktila (January 1915 to January 1916), Rangoon (January to September 1916) and back to Meiktila. In December it transferred to the Presidency Brigade, 8th (Lucknow) Division where it remained until the end of the war.
- 2/4th Battalion, Dorsetshire Regiment was formed at Dorchester in September 1914 and went to India with the brigade, arriving at Bombay between 4 and 8 January 1915. Initially, it was assigned to the Poona Brigade but was quickly transferred to Ahmednagar in 6th Poona Divisional Area (from February 1915). From January 1916 to April 1917 it was at Jullundur (later 45th (Jullundur) Brigade) in 3rd Lahore Divisional Area before returning to the 6th Poona Divisional Area and joining the Bombay Brigade. On 15 August 1917, it sailed from Bombay and arrived at Suez on 29 August. It joined the 234th Brigade, 75th Division at Deir el Balah on 19 September. The battalion was transferred to 233rd Brigade on 2 May 1918 and was disbanded on 3 August in Palestine.
- 2/4th Battalion, Duke of Edinburgh's (Wiltshire Regiment) was formed at Trowbridge in October 1914. It went to India with the brigade arriving at Bombay between 4 and 8 January 1915 and remained in India throughout the war. It served in the Poona Brigade, 6th Poona Divisional Area (January 1915 to March 1917) before transferring to the 8th (Lucknow) Division where it served in the Allahabad Brigade (March to November) and the Presidency Brigade (November 1917 to March 1918) before returning to the Allahabad Brigade where it ended the war.

=== Second World War ===
By 1939 it became clear that a new European war was likely to break out and, as a direct result of the German invasion of Czechoslovakia on 15 March, the doubling of the Territorial Army was authorised, with each unit and formation forming a duplicate. Consequently, 135th Infantry Brigade was formed in April 1939 as part of the 45th Infantry Division, duplicate of the 43rd (Wessex) Infantry Division. Unusually, it was not a mirror of its parent, the 43rd and 45th Divisions being organized on a geographical basis. (Note: Units from Cornwall, Devon and south Somerset (both the original units and their duplicates) joined the new 45th Infantry Division, whereas those from north Somerset, Dorset, Hampshire and Wiltshire remained with the 43rd (Wessex) Infantry Division.) Initially, the brigade was administered by the 43rd Division until the 45th Division began to function from 7 September 1939.

The brigade remained in the United Kingdom with the 45th Division during the Second World War and did not see active service overseas. In July 1944, the brigade started to disperse as its component units were posted away, a process that was completed on 20 July and the brigade disbanded.

The brigade was reformed on 1 September 1944 by the redesignation of 209th Infantry Brigade. It served with the 45th (Holding) Division for the rest of the war.

==== Second World War units ====
The brigade commanded the following units in the Second World War:

- 5th Battalion, Somerset Light Infantry (Prince Albert's) – until 10 July 1944
- 6th Battalion, Somerset Light Infantry (Prince Albert's) – until 13 July 1944
- 7th Battalion, Somerset Light Infantry (Prince Albert's) – until 11 September 1942
- 135th Infantry Brigade Anti-Tank Company – formed 19 June 1940, disbanded 21 January 1941 (Note: 45th Reconnaissance Battalion was formed in January 1941 from the 134th, 135th and 136th Infantry Brigade Anti-Tank Companies. It later formed 45 and 54 Columns of the Chindits.)
- 7th Battalion, Wiltshire Regiment (Duke of Edinburgh's) – from 12 September 1942 to 13 July 1944
- 4th Battalion, Devonshire Regiment – from 3 April until 10 July 1944

After being reformed by the redesignation of 209th Infantry Brigade, the brigade commanded:

- 11th Battalion, Hampshire Regiment – from 24 September 1942
- 14th Battalion, Durham Light Infantry – from 25 September 1942 until 14 November 1944
- 18th Battalion, Welch Regiment – from 20 November 1943 until 19 September 1944
- 6th Battalion, Northamptonshire Regiment – from 19 November 1943
- 2/5th Battalion, Welch Regiment – from 19 September 1944
- 11th Battalion, South Staffordshire Regiment – from 15 November 1944

== Commanders ==
=== During the First World War ===
The brigade was commanded from formation until embarkation for India by Br.-Gen. G.S.McD. Elliot. He simultaneously commanded 2nd Wessex Division until it embarked. Previously, he had been a Colonel commanding the 1st Line South Western Brigade at the outbreak of the war until it departed for India.

=== During the Second World War ===
The brigade had the following commanders in the Second World War:

From	Rank	Name	Notes
3 September 1939	Brig	A.L.W. Newth	from the outbreak of the war
26 August 1942	Brig	G.McI.S. Bruce	
2 September 1942	Lt-Col	C.L. Firbank	acting
14 September 1942	Lt-Col	G.B. Russell	acting
17 September 1942	Lt-Col	C.S. Howard	acting
26 September 1942	Lt-Col	G.B. Russell	acting
1 October 1942	Brig	J. Vicary	until 20 July 1944
10 August 1944	Brig	N.P. Procter	as commander of 209th Brigade
14 February 1945	Brig	A. Gilroy	

== See also ==
- 129th (South Western) Brigade for the 1st Line formation
- British infantry brigades of the First World War
- British brigades of the Second World War

== Bibliography ==
- Becke, Archibald F. (1936). Order of Battle of Divisions Part 2A. The Territorial Force Mounted Divisions and the 1st-Line Territorial Force Divisions (42–56). London: HMSO. OCLC 4405016.
- Becke, Archibald F. (1937). Order of Battle of Divisions Part 2B. The 2nd-Line Territorial Force Divisions (57th–69th) with The Home-Service Divisions (71st–73rd) and 74th and 75th Divisions. London: HMSO. OCLC 4405016.
- Becke, Archibald F. (1945). Order of Battle of Divisions Part 3B. New Army Divisions (30-41) & 63rd (R.N.) Division. London: HMSO. OCLC 4405016.
- Bellis, Malcolm A. (1994). Regiments of the British Army 1939–1945 (Armour & Infantry). London: Military Press International. ISBN 0-85420-999-9.
- James, E.A. (1978). British Regiments 1914–18. London: Samson Books Limited. ISBN 0-906304-03-2.
- Joslen, H. F. (2003) [1960]. Orders of Battle: Second World War, 1939–1945. Uckfield, East Sussex: Naval and Military Press. ISBN 978-1-84342-474-1.
- Perry, F.W. (1993). Order of Battle of Divisions Part 5B. Indian Army Divisions. Newport: Ray Westlake Military Books. ISBN 1-871167-23-X.
- Rinaldi, Richard A (2008). Order of Battle of the British Army 1914. Ravi Rikhye. ISBN 978-0-97760728-0.
- Westlake, Ray (1986). The Territorial Battalions, A Pictorial History, 1859–1985. Tunbridge Wells: Spellmount.
