= Reginald Hayward (VC) =

Reginald Frederick Johnson Hayward VC MC & Bar ED
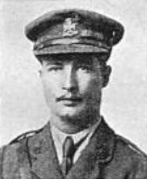
- Born: 17 June 1891; Swartberg, East Griqualand, South Africa
- Died: 17 January 1978 (aged 86); Chelsea, London, England
- Burial place: Putney Vale Crematorium, London
- Military career
- Allegiance: United Kingdom
- Branch: British Army
- Rank: Lieutenant colonel
- Units: The Wiltshire Regiment
- Conflicts: World War I: Western Front; World War II
- Awards: Victoria Cross; Military Cross & Bar; Efficiency Decoration

Reginald Frederick Johnson Hayward, VC, MC & Bar, ED (17 June 1891 – 17 January 1978) was a British Army officer and a First World War recipient of the Victoria Cross, the highest military award for gallantry in the face of the enemy given to British and Commonwealth forces.

== Biography ==
Hayward was born in Swartberg, East Griqualand, South Africa, the oldest son of Frederick Johnson and Gertrude Hayward, on 17 June 1891. He was educated at Hilton College.

He was 26 years old, and an acting captain in the 1st Battalion, The Wiltshire Regiment, British Army during the First World War when the following deed took place for which he was awarded the VC.

On 21/22 March 1918 near Fremicourt, France, while commanding a company, Captain Hayward displayed almost superhuman powers of endurance. In spite of the fact that he was buried, wounded in the head and rendered deaf on the first day of operations and had his arm shattered two days later, he refused to leave his men (even though he received a third serious injury to his head) until he collapsed from sheer exhaustion. Throughout this period the enemy were attacking the company's front without cessation, but Captain Hayward continued to move across the open from one trench to another with absolute disregard for his own safety.

Hayward served in the Anti-Aircraft Command as part of the Royal Army Service Corps, during the Second World War. He was also commander of prisoner of war camps from 1945 to 1947, and achieved the rank of lieutenant colonel.

He died in Chelsea, London, in 1978.

His VC is displayed at The Wardrobe Museum in Salisbury, Wiltshire, England.

== Bibliography ==
- Gliddon, Gerald (2013) [2004]. Spring Offensive 1918. VCs of the First World War. Stroud, Gloucestershire: The History Press. ISBN 978-0-7524-8730-4.
