= Thatipur =

- subcity
- Location in Gwalior Madhya Pradesh, India Thatipur (India)
- Coordinates: 26°14′15″N 78°13′50″E
- Country: India
- State: Madhya Pradesh
- District: Gwalior
- Named for: 34 Battalion

Government
  - Body: City Centre Tehsil

Area
  - Total: 10 km^{2} (3.9 sq mi)

Population (2011)
  - Total: 115,100
  - Rank: 263
  - Density: 12,000/km^{2} (30,000/sq mi)

Languages
  - Official: Hindi
- Time zone: UTC+5:30 (IST)
- Vehicle registration: MP-07

Thatipur is a locality in Gwalior Metropolitan region in the Indian state of Madhya Pradesh. It lies 7 km from the Old city of Gwalior and just 3 km from city centre tehsil headquarters. It is usually referred to as the new town of Gwalior because of its modern infrastructure, wide roads, and modern amenities.

== Etymology ==
"Thatipur" came from the "34 Battalion" which was located there during the British Raj. Thatipur is said to have got its name from State Army Unit 34, which once resided there.
