= 190th Heavy Anti-Aircraft Battery, Royal Artillery =

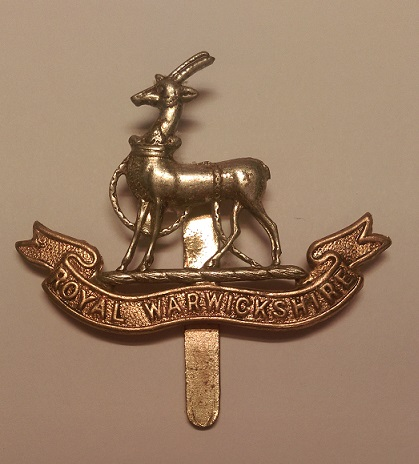
- Royal Warwickshire Regiment Cap Badge
- Active: 10 December 1936 – 10 March 1955
- Country: United Kingdom
- Branch: Territorial Army
- Role: Air defence
- Size: Battery
- Part of: 69th (Royal Warwicks) HAA Regiment; 10th HAA Regiment; 68th (North Midland) HAA Regiment; 469th (Royal Warwicks) HAA Regiment
- Garrison/HQ: Alum Rock, Birmingham
- Engagements: Battle of Britain; The Blitz; Siege of Malta

190th Heavy Anti-Aircraft Battery, Royal Artillery, was an air defence unit of Britain's Territorial Army formed in Birmingham before World War II. It defended the West Midlands against attack during the Battle of Britain and the early part of the Blitz, and was then shipped to Malta, where it served through most of the long siege when the island fortress was bombed incessantly.

== Origin ==
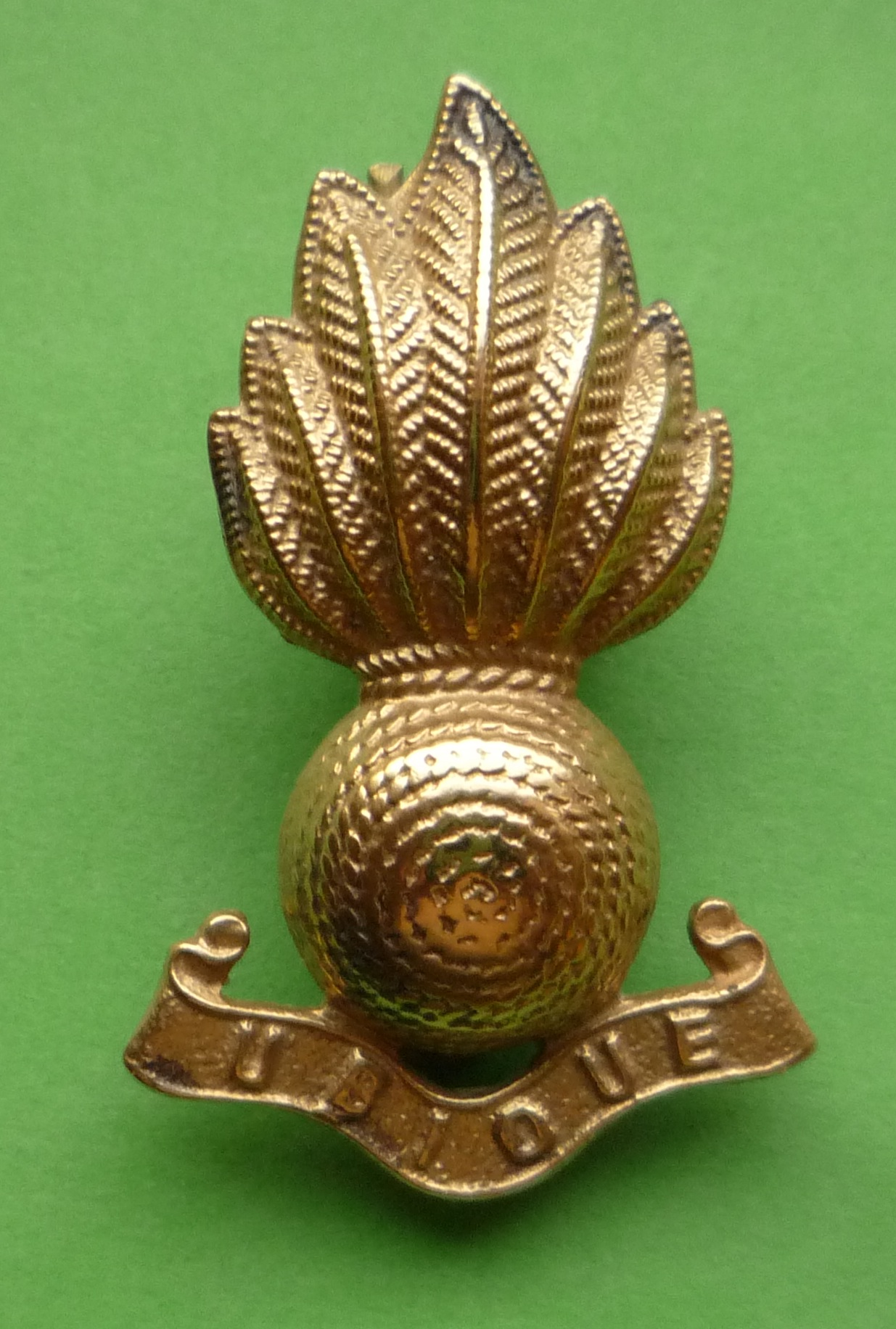
Royal Artillery collar badge

In the 1930s the increasing need for anti-aircraft (AA) defence for Britain's cities was addressed by converting a number of Territorial Army (TA) infantry units into AA gun units of the Royal Artillery (RA). The Birmingham-based 6th Battalion, Royal Warwickshire Regiment was one unit selected for this role, becoming 69th (Royal Warwickshire Regiment) Anti-Aircraft Brigade, Royal Artillery on 10 December 1936, consisting of four batteries, including 190 AA Battery. The brigade continued to wear its Royal Warwicks cap badge, together with RA collar badges. The newly converted 190 AA Bty established Battery Headquarters (BHQ) at Fernbank House, Alum Rock Road, under the command of Major E.V.M. Hughes. (From 1 January 1939, RA gun 'brigades' (such as the 69th) were termed regiments.)

== World War II ==
=== Mobilisation ===
The TA's AA units were mobilised on 23 September 1938 during the Munich Crisis, with units manning their emergency positions within 24 hours, even though many did not yet have their full complement of men or equipment. The emergency lasted three weeks, and they were stood down on 13 October. In June 1939, as the international situation deteriorated, a partial mobilisation of TA units was begun in a process known as 'couverture', whereby each AA unit did a month's tour of duty in rotation to man selected gun positions. On 24 August, ahead of the declaration of war, the units of Anti-Aircraft Command were fully mobilised at their war stations. 69th (Royal Warwickshire) AA Rgt was under the command of 34th (South Midland) Anti-Aircraft Brigade, which controlled the Gun Defended Areas (GDAs) of Birmingham and Coventry. 190 AA Battery was manning three sites at Coventry: Site A at Western Lawn Farm, Bedworth, and Site G at Tile Hill, each with two 3.7-inch guns, which were emplaced and considered 'in action' by 10.15 on 27 August, and Site L where there were two pre-positioned 3-inch guns.

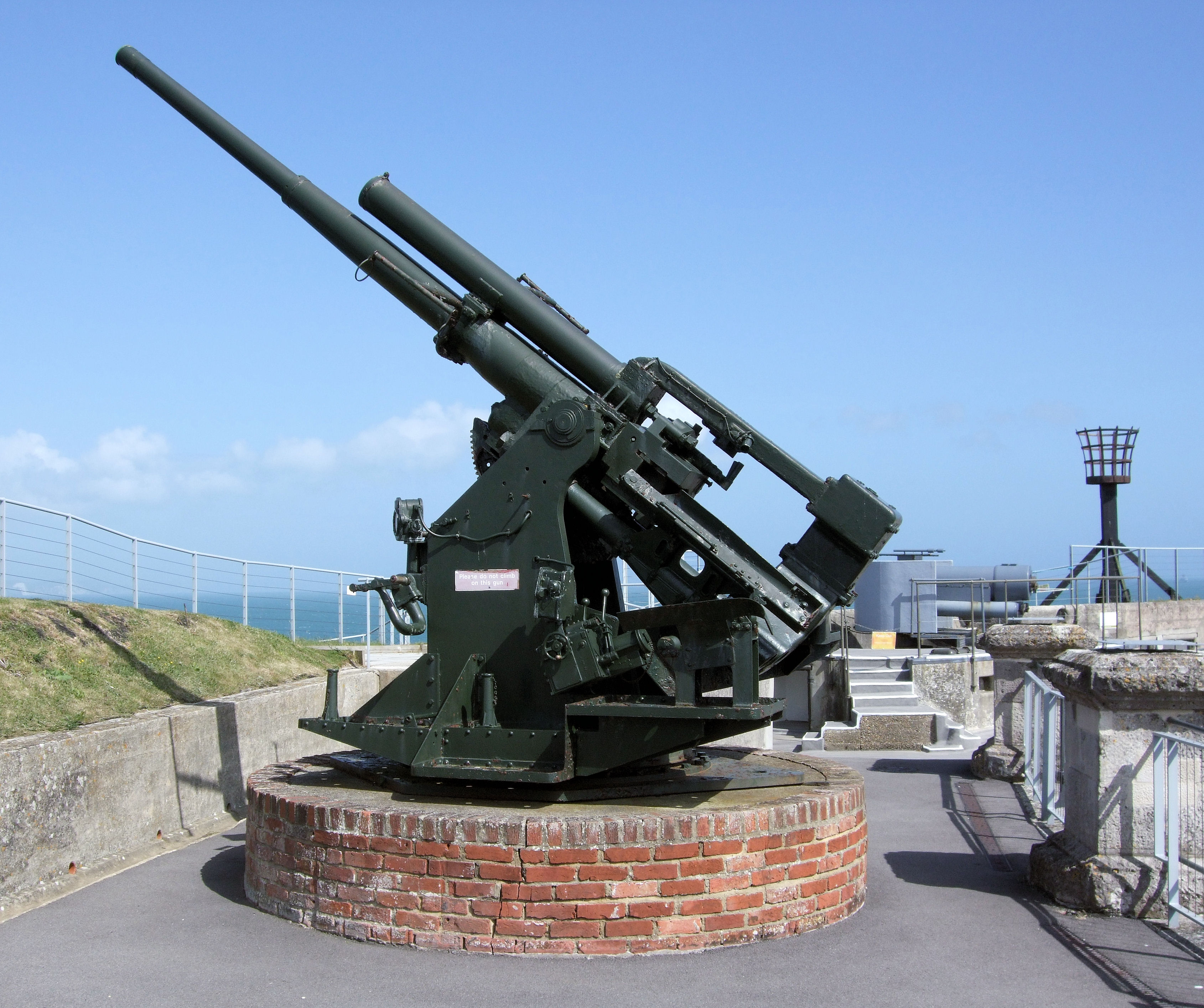
Static 3.7-inch HAA gun preserved at Nothe Fort.

=== Phoney War ===
Once war was declared there was a period known as the Phoney War where there was little to do. The regiment handed over its gunsites to 95th (Birmingham) AA Rgt and sent parties to help Warwickshire farmers with the harvest. On 24 September 190 AA Bty was temporarily broken up among the other three batteries of 69th (RWR) AA Rgt, and BHQ became the cadre for training recruits. A group of officers from the regiment volunteered to join the Regular 4th AA Rgt for service with the British Expeditionary Force (BEF) in France.

190 AA Battery was recruited back up to full strength by 19 October and took over Sites A and G once more, as well as providing detachments manning Light machine guns (LMGs) at the Ryton aircraft factory, which was designated a Vulnerable Point (VP). In the new year the regiment was manning L and T sites at Birmingham, together with the Ryton VP until the LMG detachments were relieved by another unit in February 1940. In late March the battery attended a practice camp at Tŷ Croes on Anglesey, returning in April to take over L, P and T sites in Birmingham.

=== Battle of Britain and Blitz ===
The Phoney War ended with the German invasion of the Low Countries on 10 May, and all gunsites were put on high alert, with ammunition ready, and all crews armed with rifles to deal with German paratroops. There was no immediate attack, and the battery was switched to Wolverhampton, with A Site at Coven, and C Site at Merry Hill (each with 4 x static 3.7-inch guns that needed to be mounted), and BHQ at Bromley House. On 1 June 1940, along with other units equipped with 3-inch or heavier guns, 69th (RWR) was designated a Heavy AA (HAA) Regiment and its batteries were similarly retitled. Captain D. Bromilow was promoted to Acting Major and succeeded Maj Evans in command of 190 HAA Bty.

The first enemy night intruders were heard over the gunsites in late June, but were not picked up by searchlights. However, the battery received its first GL Mk I gun-laying radar the following month. Although most of the Luftwaffe air raids during the Battle of Britain concentrated on South and South East England, the West Midlands also suffered badly, with Birmingham and Coventry experiencing heavy raids in August. The battery was in action on the nights of 12/13, 16/17 and 19/20 August, and then on three successive nights 23–26 August. Birmingham and Coventry experienced further heavy raids in October, with C Site's guns in action on the night of 15/16 and both sites on 20/21 and 21/22 October.

Then on 4 November the regiment received the order to mobilise for overseas service. 190 and the other two batteries (191 HAA Bty had preceded them a month before) arrived at the mobilisation centre at Southend-on-Sea on 14 November, and therefore missed the notorious bombing raid that destroyed Coventry that night.

=== Siege of Malta ===
190 HAA Battery under Maj Bromilow completed its mobilisation and embarked on MV Northern Prince at Birkenhead on 17 December, when it was struck off the strength of 69th (RWR) HAA Rgt. (The move overseas was cancelled for the rest of the regiment, which eventually sailed round Africa to Egypt and took part in the Siege of Tobruk and other engagements in the Western Desert Campaign.)

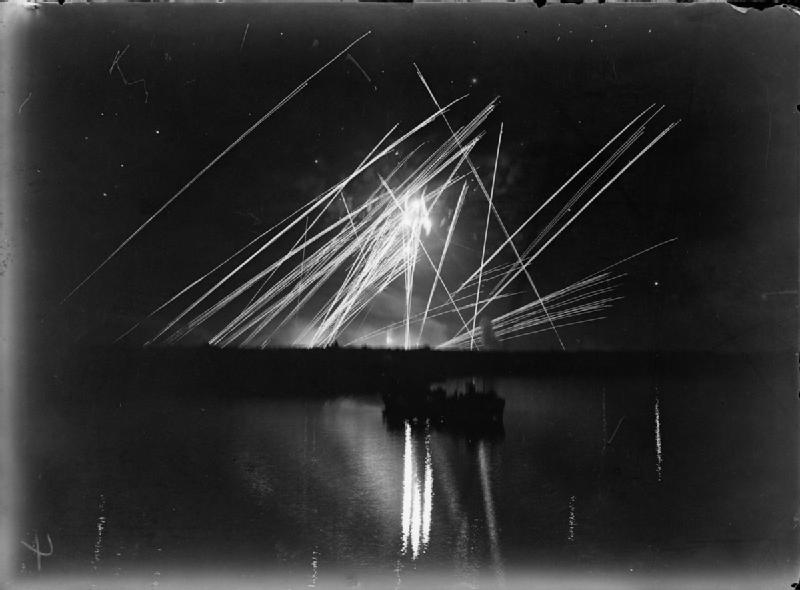
Tracer fire and shellbursts over Grand Harbour during a night air raid.

Northern Prince sailed on 19 December as part of Convoy WS 5, which was attacked and scattered by the German cruiser Admiral Hipper on 25 December, but docked safely at Gibraltar on 29 December, when the men were allowed ashore while a resupply convoy to Malta was assembled for Operation Excess. On 1 January 1941, the Northern Prince broke her moorings and was damaged, so on 6 January the battery was distributed among other ships: BHQ and No 2 Section aboard the MV Essex, Nos 1 & 3 Sections aboard MV Clan MacDonald and No 2 Section aboard MV Empire Song (even though the latter two ships were bound for Greece). The convoy was attacked by Luftwaffe Junkers Ju 88s on 10 and 11 January, but the ships were not hit. The Essex arrived in Grand Harbour, Valletta, on 12 January and BHQ and No 2 Section disembarked. The ship also carried vitally needed AA guns, including 24 3.7-inch, but these were stowed under a cargo of potatoes, and there was some delay before they could be landed. The other two ships arrived at Piraeus on 13 January where the battery personnel landed and then re-embarked on the fast cruiser HMS Orion, arriving at Malta the next day.

Now complete, 190 HAA Bty came under the command of 10th HAA Rgt, alongside 191 HAA Bty which had arrived in a previous convoy. Malta had been under air attack since the day Italy entered the war (11 June 1940) and in January 1941 the German Luftwaffe joined the Regia Aeronautica in attacks on the island, which urgently needed these AA reinforcements. Just before 190 HAA Bty arrived, the aircraft carrier HMS Illustrious put into Grand Harbour to repair damage sustained during Operation Excess and all the available AA guns concentrated to protect her during furious air attacks. She put to sea again on 23 January. Meanwhile the gunners of 190 HAA Bty busied themselves with assembling the guns unloaded from the Essex and some training. On 24 January working parties went to a gunsite at Ħaġar Qim to emplace four of the static 3.7-inch guns.

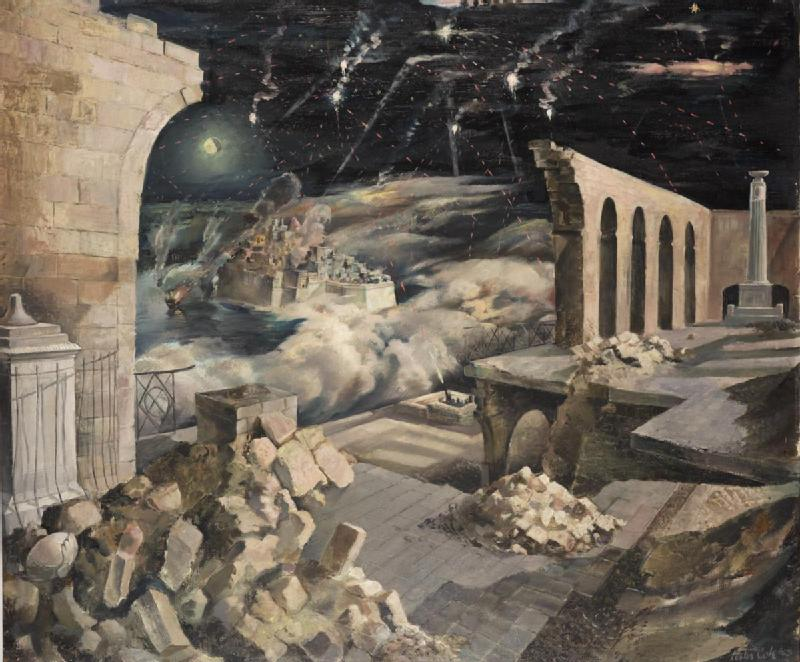
Malta – the Harbour Barrage from the Upper Barracca, by Leslie Cole; depicting an AA gun (in the centre of the composition) firing during a night air raid.

In February the Luftwaffe 's Fliegerkorps X was ordered to neutralise Malta, and it began a series of heavy bombing raids, mainly at night, accompanied by mine-dropping in and around the harbour, and daylight sweeps by Messerschmitt Bf 109 single-engined fighters. In March there was dive-bombing against the Royal Air Force (RAF) airfields, defended by 10th HAA Rgt, and attacks on a supply convoy on 23 March. The HAA guns were engaged almost every day, taking a steady toll of the bombers, but the ammunition expenditure was very great. By the beginning of June the depleted Fliegerkorps X handed responsibility back to the Italians.

Malta was largely left alone during the summer of 1941, but attacks resumed in November 1941 after Fliegerkorps II arrived in Sicily. Air raids were increasingly common during November and December, and rations and supplies began to run short. At the turn of the year headquarters instituted a policy of rotating HAA units to maintain freshness. 10th HAA Regiment exchanged with 7th HAA Rgt and took responsibility for defending Fort Manoel and Grand Harbour with a mixture of 4.5-inch, 3.7-inch and 3-inch guns.

==== 1942 ====
The Luftwaffe continued to pound the island, concentrating on the harbour and airfields, usually with raids of 15 Ju 88s escorted by 50 or more fighters. By now the RAF fighter strength had been reduced to a handful of aircraft, and the AA guns were the main defence. March and April 1942 were the period of the heaviest air raids on Malta, with well over 250 sorties a day on occasions. In April 1942 the Luftwaffe switched tactics to Flak suppression, with particular attention being paid to the HAA gunsites. On the last day of April the Regia Aeronautica rejoined the attack – which the AA gunners took as a sign that the Luftwaffe was suffering badly. By now each HAA regiment on Malta was rationed to 300 rounds per day and replacement gun barrels were scarce. When the fast minelayer HMS Welshman ran in ammunition supplies on 10 May (part of Operation Bowery), the most intense AA barrage yet fired was provided to protect her while unloading. After that, Axis air raids tailed off during the summer, apart from a flare-up in July. Only a few high-flying fighters or night bombers were engaged.

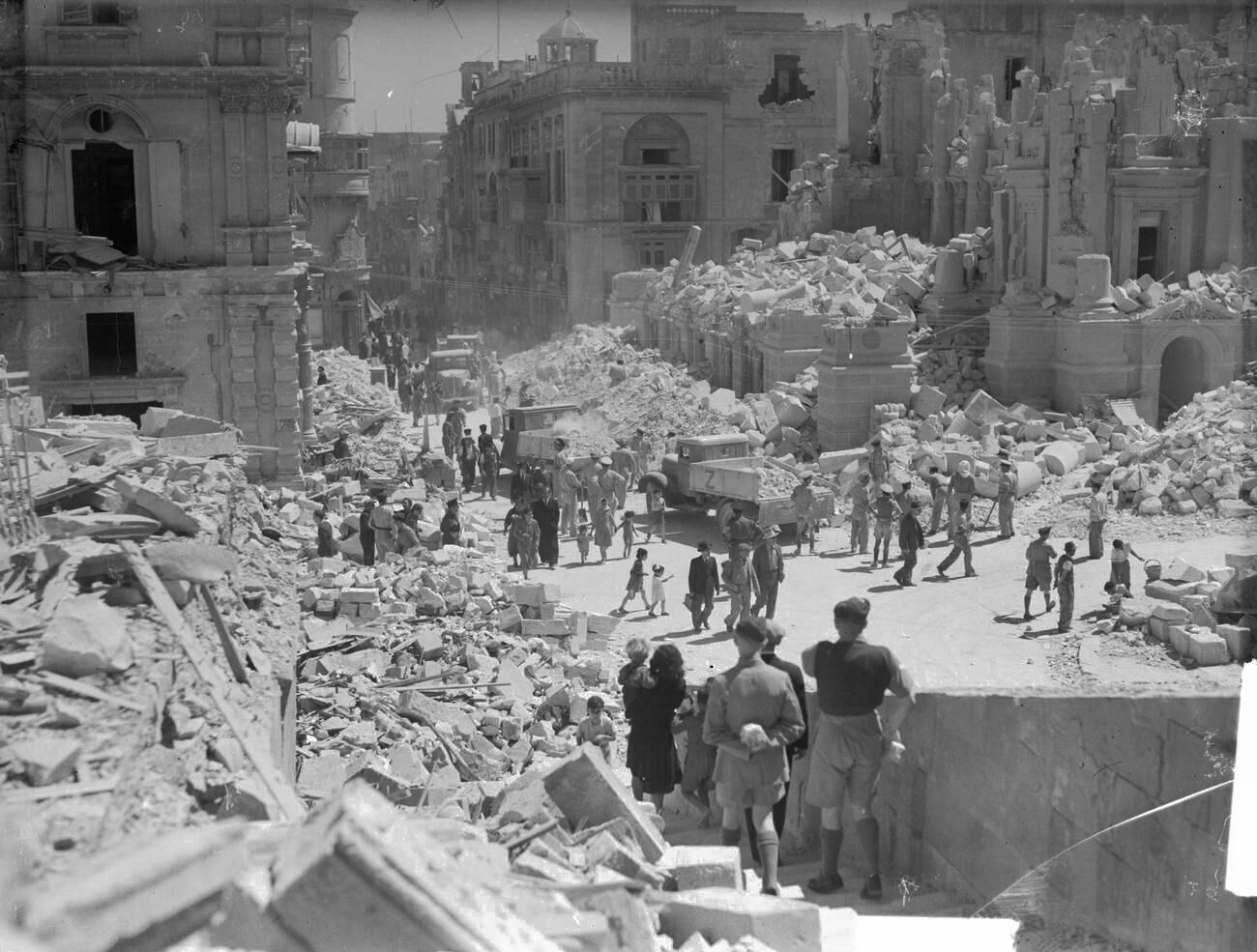
Service personnel and civilians clear up debris on a heavily bomb-damaged street in Valletta, Malta, on 1 May 1942.

By October the Luftwaffe had reinforced Fliegerkorps II, and a new round of heavy raids began, using new low-level fighter-bomber tactics, particularly against Luqa airfield, and sometimes machine-gunning the HAA positions. HAA guns had difficulty engaging these raids, but assisted the defending fighters by firing single 'pointer' rounds to conserve ammunition. This form of fighter-bomber sweep also lost heavily to the AA guns and RAF fighters. At this stage 190 HAA Bty, with seven officers, 210 other ranks, and 24 attached Maltese Auxiliaries, was billeted in Christian Brothers Street, Gzira, and the two Troops manned gunsites XHE26 (Tal-Qroqq) and XHE 27 (Naxxar), each with 4 x 3.7-inch guns.

Shortages of food and supplies on the island were now becoming serious. At last, in November Welshman and her sister ship HMS Manxman appeared, followed by a supply convoy. With the Axis defeat at Alamein and the Allied North Africa landings the same month, the siege of Malta was ended. The only enemy air activity for the rest of the year was occasional high-flying reconnaissances and one raid on Luqa in December.

==== 1943 ====
With the worst now over, the AA units on Malta could get down to refresher training. In April, A Troop exchanged gunsite XHE27 with 222 HAA Bty and took over the three static 4.5-inch Mk I guns and GL Mk II radar at XHE25 (Fleur-de-Lys or 'Flurry'). By June/July 1943 the battery formed part of a large AA concentration protecting the build-up of forces in Malta for the Allied invasion of Sicily (Operation Husky).

=== 68th (North Midland) HAA Rgt ===
RHQ of 68th (North Midland) HAA Rgt had been captured at the fall of Tobruk on 21 June 1942. However, its 222 HAA Bty remained, now forming part of 10th HAA Rgt on Malta. On 17 June 1943, RHQ 10th HAA Rgt was officially disbanded and reformed as RHQ 68th (North Midland) HAA Rgt, with the same batteries:190 and 191 from Birmingham, and 222 from Derby.

Although the AA defences of Malta were progressively run down as units returned home or joined the campaigns in Sicily and later in mainland Italy, 68th HAA Regiment remained part of the permanent garrison of the island until the end of the war and beyond. Before then all the original members of the TA battery would have left under the 'Python' home leave scheme.

== Postwar ==
68th HAA Regiment was placed in suspended animation in Malta in December 1946 so that it could be officially reformed in the TA in the UK on 1 January 1947. The personnel remaining at Tigne Camp in Malta were then considered to be a war-formed regiment in the Regular RA.

=== 56 HAA Battery ===
The war-formed 68th HAA Rgt was redesignated 36th Coast Artillery/AA Rgt on 1 April 1947. Simultaneously, 190 HAA Bty was disbanded and its personnel used to resuscitate 252 Medium Bty (from 17th Med Rgt) of the Regular RA as 56 HAA Bty. The regiment became a pure HAA unit in 1948 and in 1959 it was converted into an AA guided weapons regiment. In 1968 56 Bty transferred to 50 Missile Rgt where it remained until it was placed in suspended animation in 1993.

=== 469th (Royal Warwicks) HAA Rgt ===
Meanwhile the 69th (RWR) HAA Rgt, which had been placed in suspended animation in Italy in January 1945, reformed in the TA at Kings Heath, Birmingham, on 1 January 1947 as 469th (Royal Warwickshire Regiment) (Mixed) HAA Rgt ('Mixed' indicating that members of the Women's Royal Army Corps were integrated into the unit). However, all TA batteries were now lettered P, Q, R, S within their regiments and lost their previous distinctive numbers.

When AA Command was disbanded on 10 March 1955, 469 (RWR) HAA Rgt with three other West Midland regiments was amalgamated into 442 Light AA Rgt, in which the regimental and battery lineage was maintained by P (5th/6th Royal Warwicks) Bty. This regiment was broken up in 1961, when P Bty became C Company, 7th Bn Royal Warwickshire Regiment.

== Online sources ==
- British Army units from 1945 on
- Orders of Battle at Patriot Files
- Land Forces of Britain, the Empire and Commonwealth (Regiments.org)
