= 7th Heavy Anti-Aircraft Regiment, Royal Artillery =

VII AA Brigade, RA 7th HAA Regiment, RA 79th HAA Regiment RA
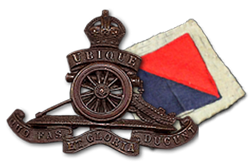
- Royal Artillery cap badge and helmet patch
- Active: 5 October 1936 – 18 March 1954
- Country: United Kingdom
- Branch: British Army
- Role: Air Defence
- Size: Regiment
- Part of: Malta Command; Anti-Aircraft Command
- Engagements: Siege of Malta (World War II)

7th Heavy Anti-Aircraft Regiment, Royal Artillery (7th HAA Rgt) was an air defence unit of the British Army that served in the Siege of Malta during World War II. It fired the first British shots in the Mediterranean Theatre in the war, and provided the basis on which the heavy anti-aircraft defences of Malta were built. Late in the war it returned to defend the UK against V-1 flying bombs, and continued in the postwar army until 1954.

== Origin ==
The unit was formed on the island of Malta as VII Anti-Aircraft Brigade (VII AA Bde) of the Royal Artillery (RA) on 5 October 1936, with 1 Survey Battery, RA. On 13 October it took over command of two existing anti-aircraft (AA) batteries, 10 and 13, which had remained in Malta when II AA Brigade had returned to the UK. It was redesignated 7th AA Regiment on 11 May 1938, when the RA adopted the more usual style of 'Regiment' rather than 'Brigade' for a lieutenant-colonel's command. It was redesignated as a Heavy AA (HAA) regiment on 1 June 1940 when the RA distinguished units equipped with 3-inch and heavier AA guns from the new Light AA (LAA) units being formed. From its formation the regiment 'provided the cadre on which the [island's] heavy AA defences were built up', training newly formed batteries of the Royal Malta Artillery (RMA).

== Composition ==
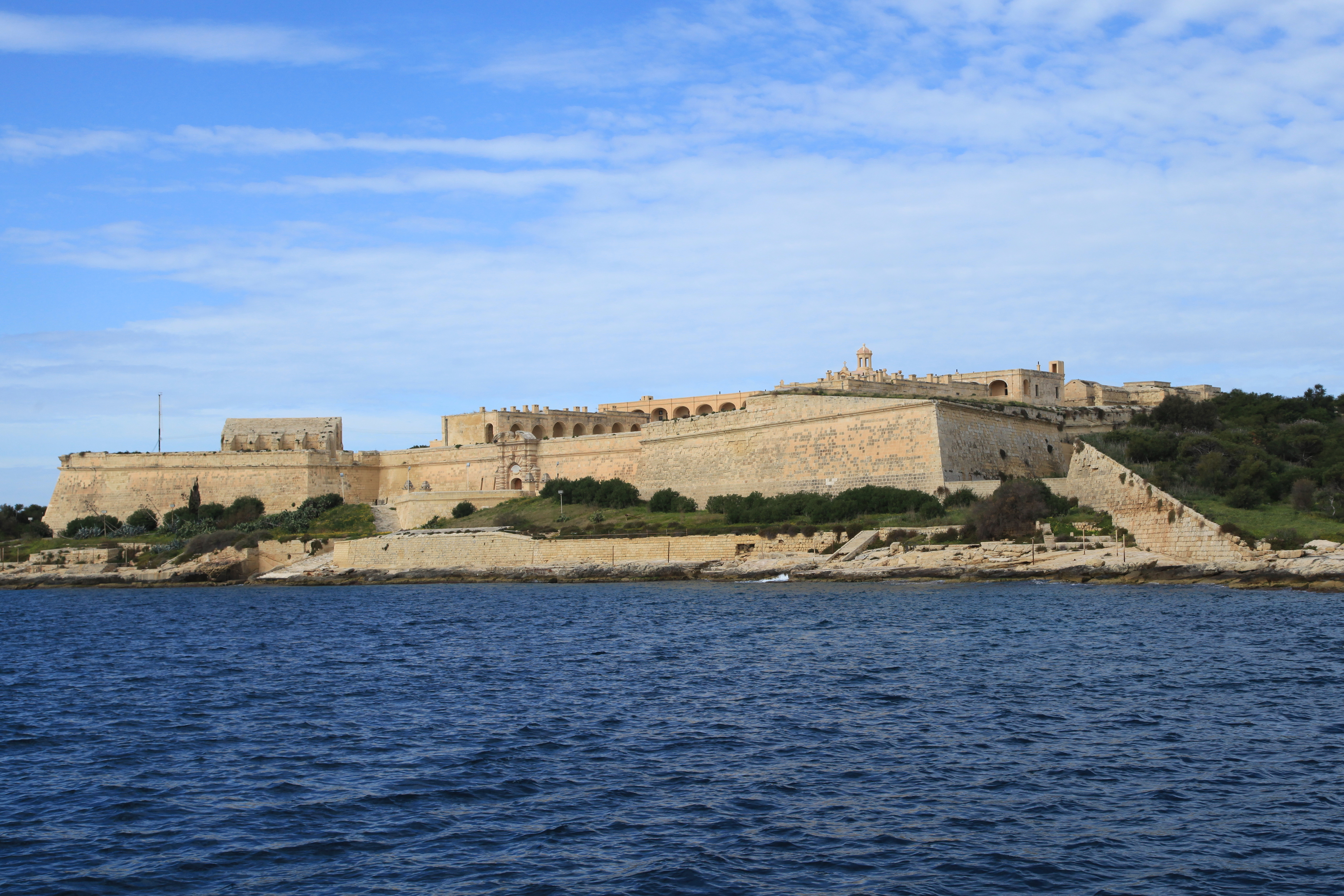
Fort Manoel.

The regiment was composed as follows:

- Regimental Headquarters (RHQ)
- 1 Survey Battery, RA: originally formed in 1920, it returned to the UK by May 1939 where it expanded to become 1st Survey Regiment, RA
- 10 AA Battery, RA: formed on 1 April 1933 and brigaded with IV Heavy Bde, RA in Malta. Placed on war footing in August 1935 during the Abyssinia crisis. Brigaded with II AA Bde for training from September 1935 when that unit arrived to reinforce the defences of Malta, until October 1936, then with the newly formed VII AA Bde
- 13 AA Battery, RA: formed on 1 July 1934 and arrived in Malta on 7 September to be brigaded with IV Heavy Bde. It too was placed on a war footing and then joined II AA Bde in September 1935, and transferred to VII AA Bde in October 1936
- Searchlight (S/L) Battery, RMA: formed by the Royal Malta Artillery (RMA) on 25 March 1939 and attached to 7th AA Rgt. Redesignated 5 AA Bty RMA in August and joined 2nd AA Rgt RMA on its formation in December 1939; this battery later served in Egypt
- 6 AA Battery, RMA: formed on 7 August 1939 and attached to 7th AA Rgt. Also joined 2nd AA Rgt RMA in December
- 7 S/L Battery, RMA: formed on 5 September 1939 and attached to 7th AA Rgt. Also later converted to AA and joined 2nd AA Rgt RMA in December

== Siege of Malta ==
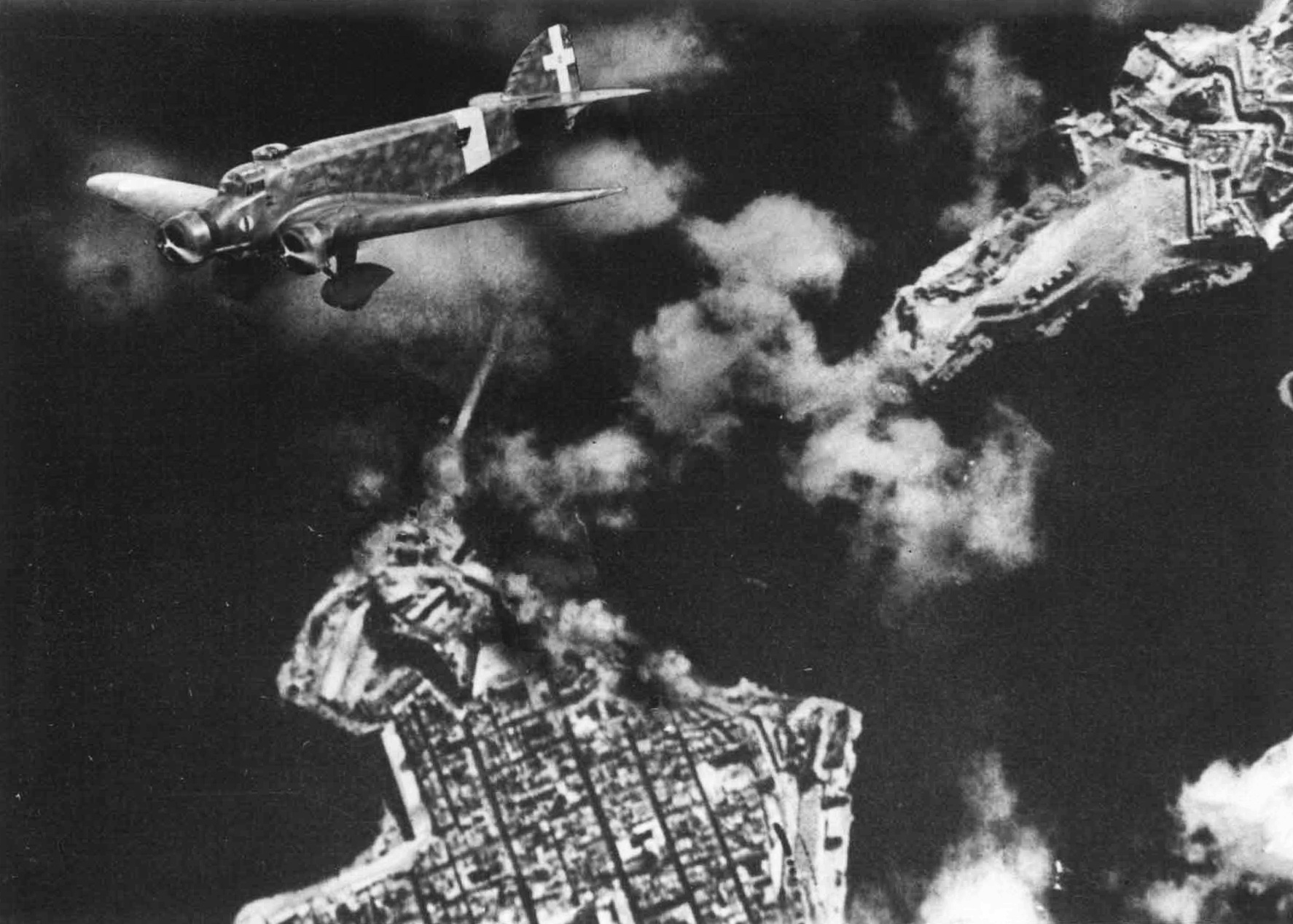
Italian aircraft bombing Grand Harbour

=== Italy declares war ===
Malta was a major naval base, being Britain's only port in the central Mediterranean on the crucial route between Gibraltar and Alexandria. During World War II it was also a forward base for the Royal Navy (RN) and the Royal Air Force (RAF) to launch attacks against the Axis powers. It was clearly at risk from air raids launched from Sicily and mainland Italy, and careful consideration had been given by the Committee of Imperial Defence to the island's AA defences. However, most of the additional AA equipment had not arrived by 1940. When Italy under Mussolini declared war on the Allies on 10 June 1940, 7th HAA Rgt was deployed as follows:

- RHQ at Fort Manoel
- 10 HAA Bty
  - Fort Manoel (4 x 3.7-inch)
  - Marsa (4 x 3.7-inch)
- 13 HAA Bty
  - San Giacomo (4 x 4.5-inch)
  - French Creek (1 2-pounder multiple pom-pom)
  - Isola Point (1 multiple pom-pom being installed)

The first Italian air raid came at 06.45 the following day, when two formations appeared at 12,000 feet, each of five Savoia-Marchetti SM.79 bombers, and were engaged by all the AA gun positions. One bomber was shot down, claimed by the Marsa and San Giacomo sites, and one man of 13 HAA Bty was killed when the telephonists' hut at French Creek received a direct hit. These were the first British shots fired in the Mediterranean Theatre in the war.

Thereafter there were regular raids by the Regia Aeronautica – 36 more in June alone. The fierce reception they received forced the Italians to change tactics and by the end of July admitted the loss of 20 aircraft.

On 2 September, as part of Operation Hats, the battleship HMS Valiant arrived at the island with eight 3-7-inch guns and twelve 40 mm Bofors guns carried as deck cargo, and a draft of gunners including trained operators for the single GL Mk I gun-laying radar established at San Giacomo since 4 August. Four of the 3-7-inch guns were offloaded, refurbished, transported and installed at Bubaqra, ready for action within 7 hours of Valiant 's arrival. The sections of 13 HAA Bty manning 2-pounder pom-poms moved to Bubakra to man these guns.

=== 27 HAA Battery ===
On 1 October the regiment was joined by 27 HAA Bty, which had arrived from Egypt. The battery had been formed in the UK at the outbreak of World War II and had mobilised as part of 4th HAA Rgt. It moved to France on 9 November 1939 to join the British Expeditionary Force. When the Battle of France began in May it was defending airfields around Aubigny and Arras; it took part in the BEF's advance into Belgium on 10 May and took up positions round Tournai. Here it was in action for six days as the town was bombed by the Luftwaffe. From 18 May it covered the BEF's retreat, defending bridges and routes. Repeated attacks on 20 May saw the guns in constant action, then it retreated for six days, alternately moving and deploying, with dwindling ammunition. On 28 May the regiment was ordered to destroy all equipment except the guns, which were kept in action with minimum crews while the remainder made their way back to Dunkirk. From 29 May the crews lay under air attack for 36 hours at Bray-Dunes until allowed to organise their own evacuation on 31 May.

Re-equipped, 27 HAA Bty joined 2nd HAA Rgt (the old II AA Bde), which was shipped to Suez, where it arrived on 1 September 1940. While the rest of regiment went up into the Western Desert, 27 Bty re-embarked for Malta on 27 September and arrived three days later.

=== 1941 ===
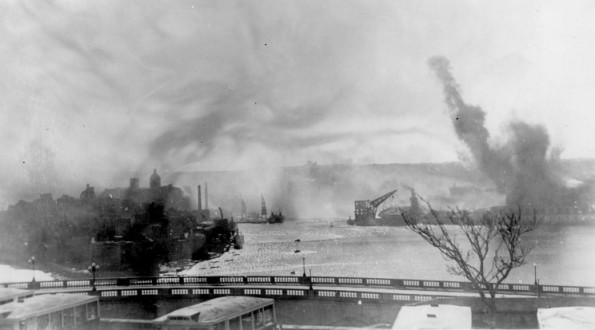
HMS Illustrious (right of crane) under attack.

By the end of 1940, 59th Light AA Bty had also arrived and joined 7th AA Rgt (which temporarily dropped the 'heavy'), manning Bofors guns. 7th AA's RHQ at Fort Manoel had the 4 x 3.7-inch guns of 10 HAA Bty, together with two Bofors, a Naval pom-pom, three Light machine guns (LMGs) and an old 4-inch gun known as 'Smyth' manned by a medical orderly and four officers' batmen.

By January 1941, the German Luftwaffe had joined the Regia Aeronautica in attacks on Malta. On 11 January the damaged aircraft carrier HMS Illustrious came into Grand Harbour for repairs. The Luftwaffe laid on a major air raid (possibly 50 Junkers Ju 88 and 20 Junkers Ju 87 Stuka 's) on 16 January to finish off the carrier, but the AA guns on the island had been re-sited to defend the ship alongside Parlotorio Wharf with a 'box' barrage, and the raiders suffered heavily. A second raid made two days later was also disrupted by the defences. Only one bomb hit the ship, but the adjacent towns were badly hit, and nearby ships and 7th AA Rgt suffered casualties. On 19 January the Luftwaffe tried again, with a diversionary raid on Luqa airfield, causing more casualties to the regiment. Illustrious made her way to Alexandria under her own steam on 23 January. One Military Cross and two Military Medals were awarded to members of the regiment for their conduct during these raids.

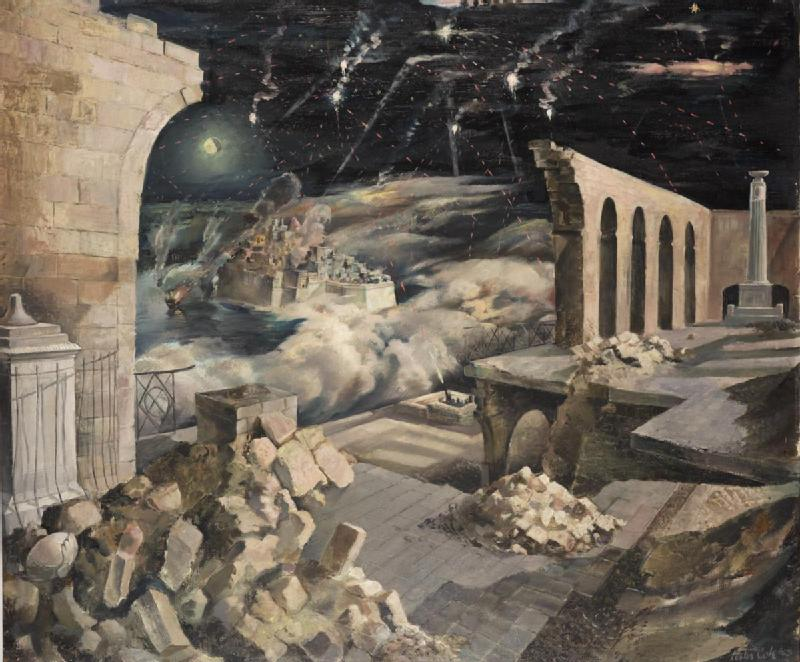
Malta – the Harbour Barrage from the Upper Barracca, by Leslie Cole; depicting an AA gun (in the centre of the composition) firing during a night air raid.

In February the Luftwaffe 's Fliegerkorps X was ordered to neutralise Malta, and it began a series of heavy bombing raids, mainly at night, accompanied by mine-dropping in and around the harbour, and daylight sweeps by Messerschmitt Bf 109 single-engined fighters. In March there was dive-bombing against the RAF airfields, and attacks on a supply convoy on 23 March. The regiment was engaged almost every day, and the HAA guns took a steady toll on the bombers. By the beginning of June the depleted Fliegerkorps X handed responsibility back to the Italians.

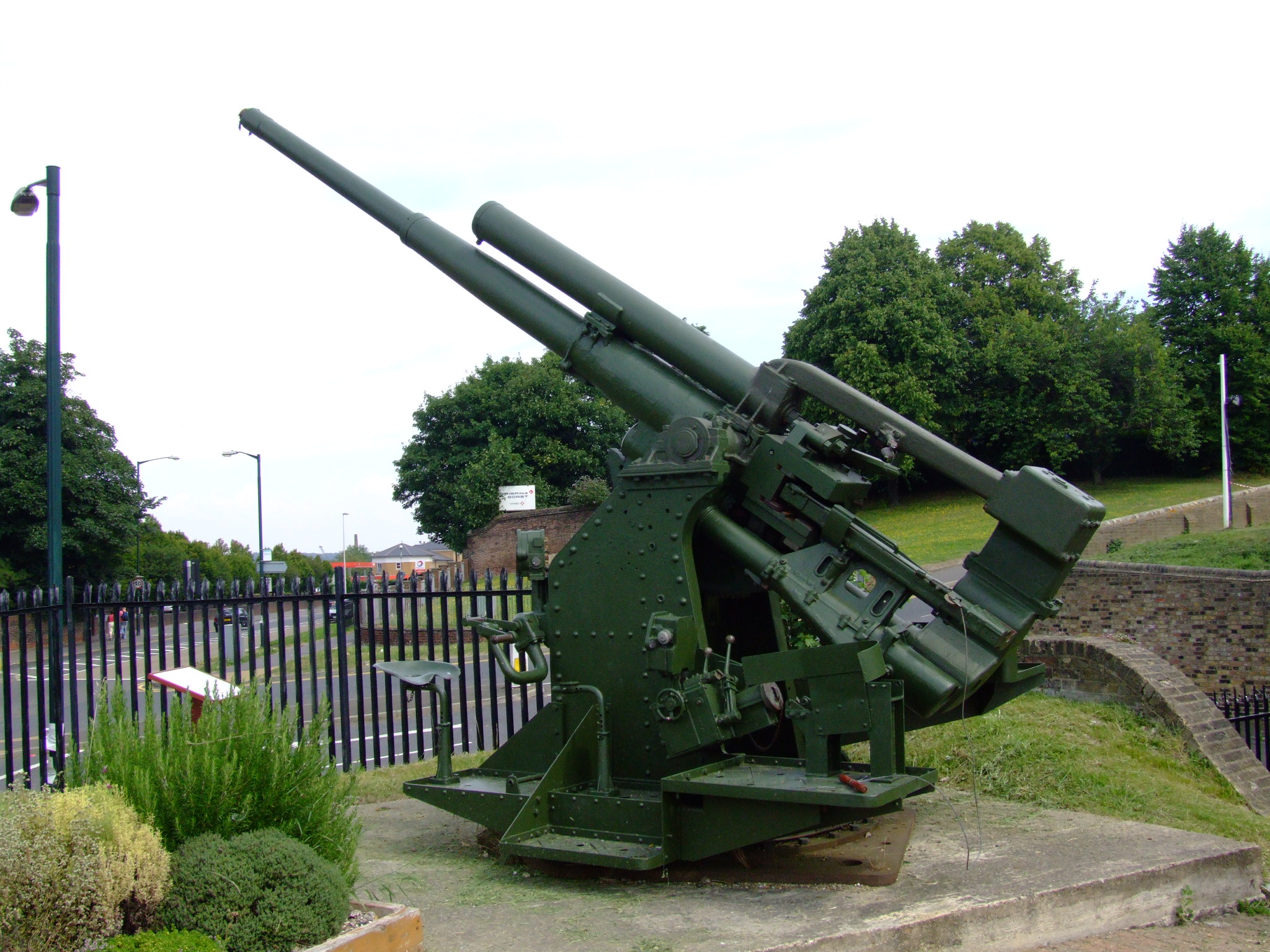
Static 3.7-inch HAA gun preserved at Fort Amherst.

From April 1941, the regiment, together with the newly arrived 10th HAA Rgt and the RMA HAA, came under 7 AA Brigade covering the south half of the island, while 10 AA Brigade took the north. This arrangement was found not to work, and soon 7 AA Bde took over all the LAA and S/L defences, and 10th AA Bde commanded the HAA guns, including 7th HAA Rgt. The regiment also received some static 3.7-inch guns, which had a faster rate of traverse than the mobile guns used up until then. These were emplaced at Fort Manoel. Members of the regiment were commended for work in evacuating casualties from a bombed hospital, and in fire-fighting.

Malta was largely left alone during the summer of 1941, but attacks resumed in November 1941 after Fliegerkorps II arrived in Sicily. On 1 November a high-flying bomber jettisoned its bombs, hitting a barrack room in Fort Manoel and killing five off-duty gunners of 7th HAA Rgt. Air raids were increasingly common during November and December, and rations and supplies began to run short.

=== 1942 ===
At the turn of the year 10 HAA Bde instituted a policy of rotating its units to maintain freshness. 7th HAA Rgt exchanged with 10th HAA Rgt and took responsibility for defending the RAF airfields inland. At this point it manned 20 x 3.7-inch and 4 x 3-inch guns. Lieutenant-Colonel H.A. Dix, who had commanded the regiment for two years, was posted to the UK and Major G.W. Meates of 27 HAA Bty was promoted to succeed him.

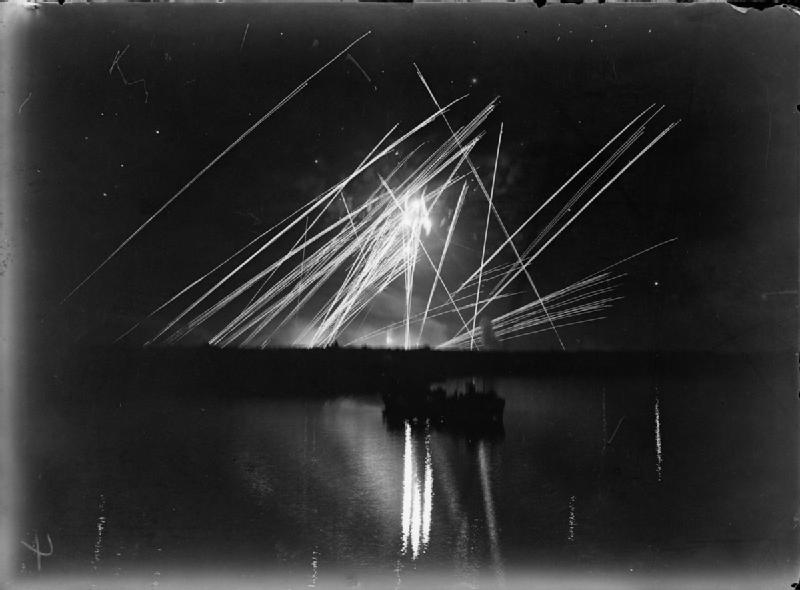
Tracer fire and shellbursts over Grand Harbour during a night air raid.

The Luftwaffe continued to pound the island, concentrating on the harbour and airfields, usually with 15 Ju 88s escorted by 50 or more fighters. A major attack on RAF Ta Kali on 20 March comprised 80–100 Ju 88s, engaged by 10 and 13 HAA Btys. By now the RAF fighter strength had been reduced to a handful of aircraft, and the AA guns were the main defence. In late March the Royal Navy supply ship HMS Breconshire was bombed on a run in to Malta, and a Troop of 13 HAA Bty provided AA cover with 3-inch guns while she was towed up the coast to Kalafrano Bay. March and April 1942 were the period of the heaviest air raids on Malta, with well over 250 sorties a day on occasions.

Then in April 1942 the Luftwaffe switched tactics to Flak suppression, with particular attention being paid to the HAA gunsites. C Troop of 13 HAA Battery sited at Hompesch was hit on 2 and 10 April, and several gunners had to be dug out; 27 HAA Bty at Marsa was hit and suffered numerous casualties; but F Trp, 27 HAA Bty, at Tal Handak, near Luqa airfield, was worst hit, being dive-bombed for seven days in succession, suffering damage and casualties, but remaining in action.

On the last day of April the Regia Aeronautica rejoined the attack – which 7th HAA Rgt took as a sign that the Luftwaffe was suffering badly. By now each HAA regiment on Malta was rationed to 300 rounds per day (7th HAA Rgt had already fired 37,100 rounds in the first four months of 1942) and replacement gun barrels were scarce. When the fast minelayer HMS Welshman ran in ammunition supplies on 10 May (part of Operation Bowery), the most intense AA barrage yet fired was provided to protect her while unloading. After that, Axis air raids tailed off during the summer, apart from a flare-up in July.

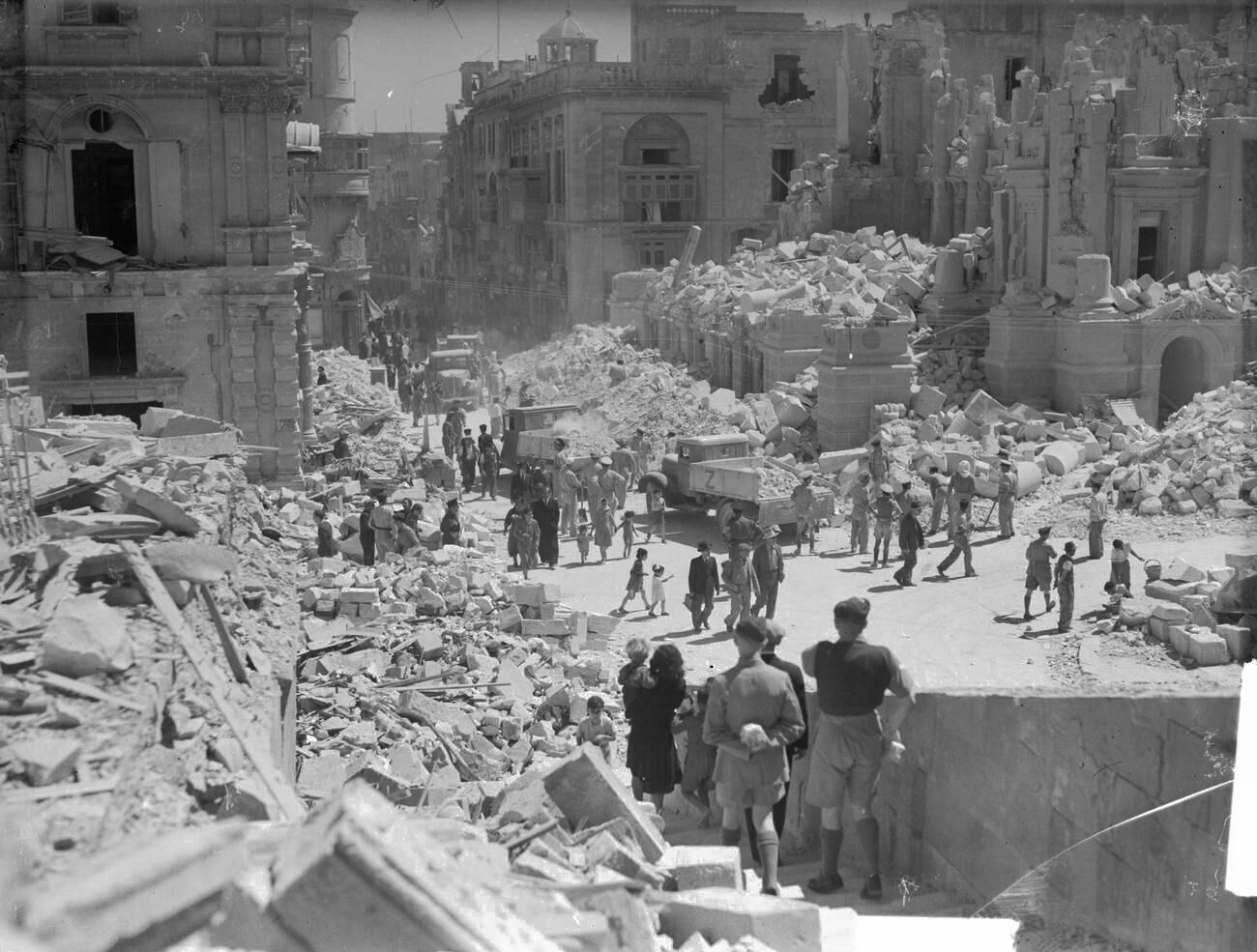
Service personnel and civilians clear up debris on a heavily bomb-damaged street in Valletta, Malta, on 1 May 1942.

In May 1942 the regiment was disposed at gunsites in west central Malta as follows:

- Marsa (XHC 11) – 4 x 3.7-inch
- Tal-Ħandaq (XHC 12) – 4 x 3.7-inch
- Tal-Lanza ('Lancer') (XHC 13) – 2 x 3.7-inch
- Żebbuġ (XHC 14) – 4 x 3.7-inch
- Ix Xaghra tal Isqof ('Palace') (XHC 15) – 4 x 3.7-inch
- Siġġiewi (XHC 30) – 2 x 3.7-inch
- Il-Hofor ('Hillside') (XHD 20) – 3 x 3-inch

By October the Luftwaffe had reinforced Fliegerkorps II, and a new round of heavy raids began, using new low-level tactics. However, these attacks also lost heavily to the AA guns and RAF fighters, despite the increasing shortages of food and supplies on the island. At last, in November Welshman and her sister ship HMS Manxman appeared, followed by a supply convoy. With the Axis defeat at Alamein and the Allied North Africa landings (Operation Torch) the same month, the siege of Malta was ended. The only enemy air activity for the rest of the year was occasional high-flying reconnaissances and one raid on Luqa in December.

=== 1943–44 ===
7th HAA Regiment remained as part of 10 HAA Bde on Malta for the whole of 1943. In May, Axis aircraft reappeared in an attempt to disrupt preparations for the Allied invasion of Sicily (Operation Husky), but these raids caused little damage. The regiment's gunsite dispositions in July 1943 were:

- Tal-Ħandaq (XHC 12) – 4 x 3.7-inch Mk II, GL Mk II (13 HAA Bty)
- Lancer (XHC 13) – 4 x 3.7-inch Mk II, GL Mk II (10 HAA Bty)
- Żebbuġ (XHC 14) – 4 x 3.7-inch Mk II, GL Mk II (10 HAA Bty)
- Palace (XHC 15) – 2x 3.7-inch Mk IA, 1 x 3.7-inch Mk III (27 HAA Bty)

After the Surrender of Italy on 8 September 1943 the defences of Malta began to be scaled back. On 3 March 1944, 7th HAA Rgt handed over its RHQ at Tal-Ħandaq to 2 HAA Rgt Royal Malta Artillery and embarked on HM Transport Aorangi for Britain. Twenty-eight men of the regiment had died during its service on Malta.

== Home Defence ==
On arrival in Britain in April 1944, 7th HAA Rgt joined Anti-Aircraft Command. The following month it was assigned to 33 AA Bde in 4 AA Group covering North West England, but in June it joined 59 AA Bde in the Orkney and Shetland Defences (OSDEF).

In December 1944 the regiment moved south and joined 71 AA Bde in 1 AA Group, which controlled a large number of AA units stretching from the Thames Estuary to Dover to defend London and South East England from V-1 flying bombs. In February 1945 the regiment was transferred to 2 AA Group in South East England, and remained with it until after the war had ended.

By November 1945, 7 HAA Rgt (10, 13, 27 Btys) had returned to 33 AA Bde, now in 5 AA Group, which contained several other Regular HAA Rgts that were to continue in the post-war Army.

== Postwar ==
On 1 April 1947, RHQ of 7th HAA Rgt was redesignated RHQ 79th HAA Regiment, and 10, 13 and 27 HAA Btys became 215, 217 and 238 HAA Btys respectively. (Simultaneously the Territorial Army's former 79th (Hertfordshire Yeomanry) HAA Rgt reformed as 479 (Mobile) (Hertfordshire Yeomanry) HAA Rgt.) The regiment was stationed at Ladysmith Camp, Ashton under Lyne, under the command of Lt-Col W.A.C.M. Morgan. It formed part of 9 AA Bde in 4 AA Group, covering the Mersey and Manchester area. From about 1949 the regiment was stationed at High Legh Camp, Knutsford. On 15 January 1954 the regiment was ordered into suspended animation at High Legh camp, and the process of disbandment was complete by 18 March.

== Commanding Officers ==
The following were among the COs of the regiment:

- Lt-Col H.M.J. McIntyre, on outbreak of war, September 1939 (later commanded 2 AA Bde in Sicily and Italy)
- Lt-Col H.A. Dix from 19 January 1940
- Lt-Col G.W. Meates from 13 February 1942
- Lt-Col W.A.C.M. Morgan, 79 HAA Rgt on formation
