= Abdiel-class minelayer =

Class of six fast minelayers commissioned into the Royal Navy

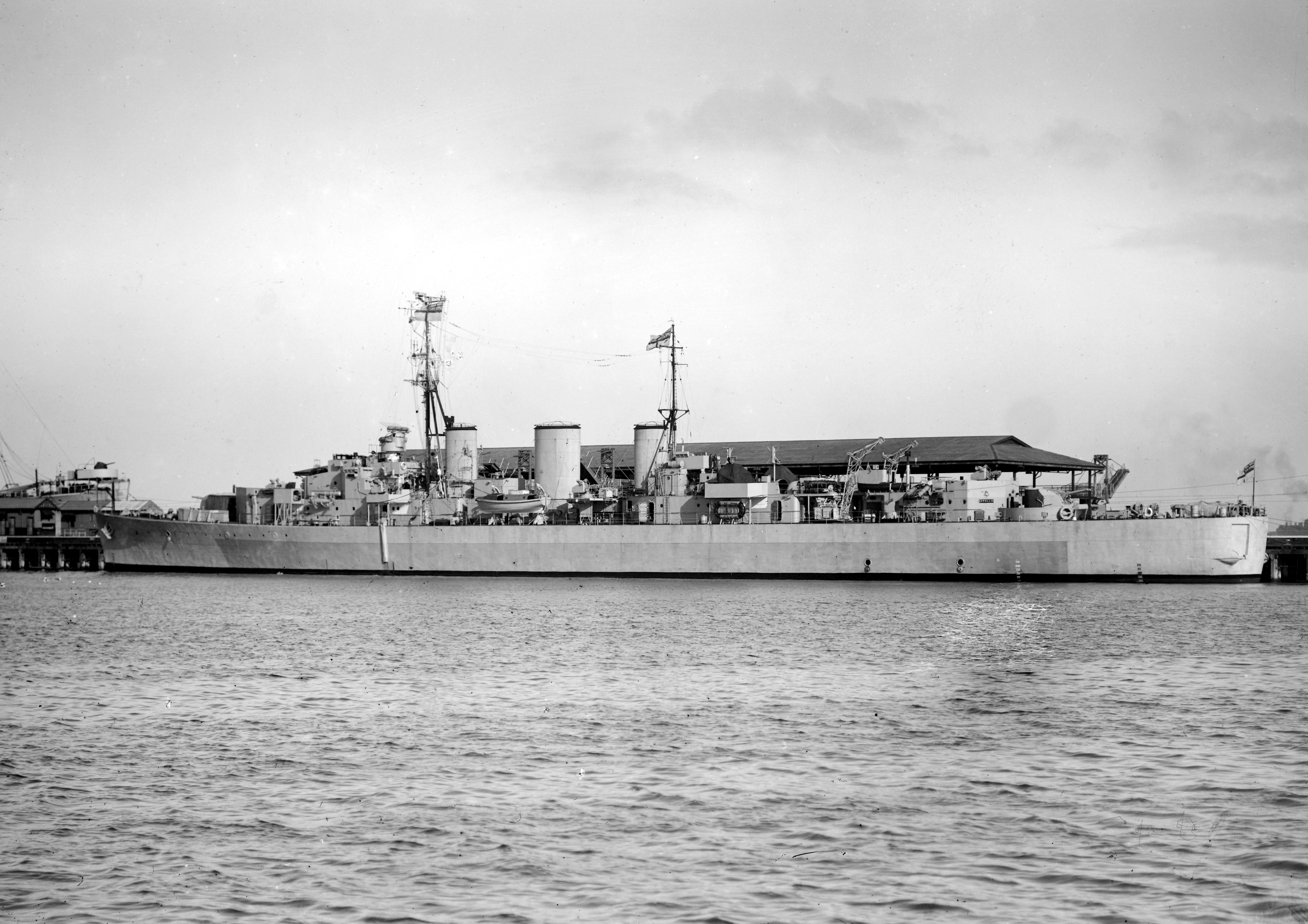
- HMS Apollo in August 1945

Class overview
- Name: Abdiel class
- Operators: Royal Navy
- In commission: 1941–1972
- Completed: 6
- Lost: 3
- Retired: 3

General characteristics
- Type: Minelayer
- Displacement: 2,650 tons (standard); 3,415 tons (full load) (1938 group); 3,475 tons (full load) (WEP group)
- Length: 400 ft 6 in (122.07 m) (p/p); 418 ft (127 m) (o/a)
- Beam: 40 ft (12 m)
- Draught: 11 ft 3 in (3.43 m); 14 ft 9 in (4.50 m) (full load)
- Propulsion: 4 × Admiralty 3-drum water-tube boilers; Parsons geared steam turbines; 2 shafts; 72,000 shp (54,000 kW)
- Speed: 38 knots (70 km/h; 44 mph) (up to 40 knots (74 km/h; 46 mph) at light load)
- Range: 1,000 nmi (1,900 km; 1,200 mi) at 38 knots (70 km/h; 44 mph) 5,810 nmi (10,760 km; 6,690 mi) at 15 knots (28 km/h; 17 mph)
- Complement: 242
- Armament: 1938 group: 6 × QF 4-inch (100 mm) Mark XVI guns on twin mounts HA/LA Mk.XIX; 4 × QF 2-pounder (40 mm) Mk.VIII on quadruple mount Mk.VII; 8 × 0.5-inch (12.7 mm) Vickers machine guns on quadruple mount Mk.I (later up to 12 × 20 mm Oerlikon on single mounts P Mk.III or twin mounts Mk.V); 156 mines; WEP group: 4 × QF 4 in Mark XVI on twin mounts HA/LA Mk.XIX; 4 (Apollo) / 6 (Ariadne) × 40 mm Bofors on twin mounts "Hazemeyer" Mk.IV; Up to 12 × 20 mm Oerlikon on single mounts P Mk.III or twin mounts Mk.V (later up to 6 × 40 mm Bofors on single mounts Mark V "Boffin"; 156 mines

The Abdiel class were a class of six fast minelayers commissioned into the Royal Navy and active during the Second World War. They were also known as the Manxman class and as "mine-laying cruisers". These ships were armed with a wide variety of defensive weapons from 0.5-inch (13 mm) machine guns to the 4-inch (100 mm) main armament. They were also equipped with a wide array of radars, along with their normal complement of mines. They were easily mistaken for destroyers. Half the class was lost through enemy action during the Second World War; the others saw post-war service, and the last example was scrapped in the early 1970s.

== Design ==
The Royal Navy ordered the first four ships in 1938, with a further two acquired as part of the War Emergency Programme. They were specifically designed for the rapid laying of minefields in enemy waters, close to harbours or sea lanes. As such they were required to be very fast and to possess sufficient anti-aircraft weaponry to defend themselves if discovered by enemy aircraft. A large load of up to 150 mines was required to be carried under cover, therefore a long, flushdecked hull with high freeboard was required. The mines were laid through doors in the stern; the ships carried their own cranes for loading.

In size these ships were almost as long as a cruiser but laid out much like a large destroyer except for the three straight funnels, which were an instant identifying feature. Top speed was specified as 40 knots (74 km/h; 46 mph). To achieve this they were given a full cruiser set of machinery and with an installed output of 72,000 shaft horsepower (54,000 kW) on two shafts, they made 39.75 knots (73.62 km/h; 45.74 mph) light and 38 knots (70 km/h; 44 mph) deep load. To put this into perspective, the contemporary Town-class cruisers had 80,000 shp (60,000 kW) and a full load displacement of 12,980 tons, just short of four times that of the Abdiels.

The ships were initially to be armed much as destroyers, with three twin HA/LA Mark XIX mounts for QF 4-inch (100 mm) L/45 Mark XIV guns, with an elevation of 70°, in 'A', 'B' and 'X' positions, a quadruple "multiple pom-pom" mounting Mark VIII for the QF 2-pounder Mark VIII and a pair of quadruple 0.5-inch Vickers machine guns.

Wartime modifications involved adding a Type 279 radar at the masthead, a primitive metric wavelength air warning set, later replaced by a Type 286 then a Type 291, as they became available. A Type 285 radar was fitted to the rangefinder-director on the bridge, this was a metric set and could provide target ranging and bearing information. The centimetric Type 272, a target indication radar with plan position indicator (PPI), was fitted to the front leg of the foremast. Following the loss of Latona to air attack, the surviving ships were re-armed to remedy the shortcomings in anti-aircraft defence. Six single Oerlikon 20 mm cannons were initially added on P Mark III pedestal mountings, although these were later replaced by powered twin Mark V mountings.

Ariadne and Apollo had two twin Mark IV Hazemeyer mountings for Bofors 40 mm guns sited amidships, replacing the pom-pom in 'Q' position and these mounts had Type 282 Radar for target ranging; Ariadne had an additional Hazemeyer mounting in 'B' position, replacing the 4-inch guns. In July 1945, Ariadne was refitted in the United States for far eastern service, when the Bofors mounts were replaced by American pattern models (Mark I) with off-mounting "simple tachymetric directors" (STD) fitted with Type 282 Radar and the Oerlikon mounts re-gunned with Bofors guns (this combination was known as the "Boffin").

While generally a successful design, these ships suffered from two fundamental problems. The first was their low endurance. Designed for an endurance of 5,300 miles (8,500 km) at 15 knots (28 km/h; 17 mph) after six months out of dock, sea trials showed 4,680 miles (7,530 km) to be a more realistic estimate and this endurance dropped sharply at high speeds. This limited their ability to deploy even in the constricted waters of the Mediterranean Sea to the point that Admiral Cunningham recommended that ships still under construction be fitted with additional fuel tanks, which was done for the last two vessels. The second problem lay in their vulnerability to damage. They had no armour protection or anti-torpedo bulges and their large machinery spaces and large, undivided mining deck limited their internal compartmentalization, which left them vulnerable to flooding.

== Service ==
Although they were effective ships in their intended role, the combination of high internal capacity and exceptionally high speed meant that they were equally valuable as fast transports. As such, for much of their service, they were used for running supplies, particularly men and matériel, to isolated garrisons such as during the Siege of Tobruk and Malta in Operation Harpoon. With three funnels and the outline of a destroyer, Welshman was camouflaged to appear like the Vichy French contre torpilleur (large destroyer) Tigre. For this, a false bow was fitted, funnel caps were added, the mine chutes were plated over and a false deckline was painted on to camouflage the high flush deck. Manxman received a similar disguise to pass for the Vichy contre torpilleur Léopard so she could pass Corsica and mine the approaches to Livorno.

On 25 October 1941, Latona was hit by a 250 lb (110 kg) bomb in the engine room, causing a serious fire that spread to the munitions she was carrying and resulting in her loss. Welshman was torpedoed and sunk by U-617 in 1943. Manxman was torpedoed in her engine room but survived, although repairs took two years.

Apollo, Ariadne and Manxman survived the war and saw post-war service, with their pennant numbers changed from "M" to "N". Apollo served as a despatch vessel and Manxman as a mine warfare support ship. In 1953, Manxman was used to depict a German raider in the re-made film of C. S. Forester's novel Brown on Resolution; for this her funnels were enlarged to alter her outline, dummy 6-inch barrels were fitted over her 4-inch guns, and her bow was painted to indicate 'torpedo damage'.

== Ships ==
Type	Name	Builder	Laid Down	Launched	Completed	Fate
1938 group	Abdiel	J. Samuel White & Company, Cowes	29 March 1939	23 April 1940	15 April 1941	Sunk by mines on 9 September 1943 in Taranto Bay.
1938 group	Latona	John I. Thornycroft & Company, Woolston	4 March 1939	20 August 1940	4 May 1941	Bombed by Italian aircraft off Libya north of Bardia and foundered on 25 October 1941.
1938 group	Manxman	Alexander Stephen & Sons, Linthouse	24 March 1939	5 September 1940	20 June 1941	Sold for scrap in 1972.
1938 group	Welshman	Hawthorn Leslie & Company, Hebburn	8 June 1939	4 September 1940	25 August 1941	Torpedoed by U-617 off Crete on 1 February 1943
War Emergency Programme (WEP) group	Ariadne	A. Stephen & Sons Ltd	10 October 1941	5 April 1943	12 February 1944	Sold for scrap in June 1965
War Emergency Programme (WEP) group	Apollo	Hawthorn Leslie and Company	15 November 1941	16 February 1943	9 October 1943	Sold for scrap in 1962

== See also ==
- List of ship classes of the Second World War
- French cruiser Pluton
- USS Terror
- Robert H. Smith-class destroyer
- HMS Adventure

== Bibliography ==
- Caruana, Joseph (2012). "Emergency Victualling of Malta During WWII". Warship International. LXIX (4): 357–364. ISSN 0043-0374.
- Cocker, M. P. (1993). Mine Warfare Vessels of the Royal Navy: 1908 to Date. Shrewsbury: Airlife Publishing. ISBN 1-85310-328-4.
- Gardiner, Robert (1980). Conway's All the World's Fighting Ships 1922–1946. Annapolis, MD: Naval Institute Press. ISBN 0-87021-913-8.
- Lenton, H. T. (1998). British and Empire Warships of the Second World War. London: Greenhill Books. ISBN 1-85367-277-7.
- Nicholson, Arthur (2015). Very Special Ships: Abdiel-Class Fast Minelayers of World War Two. Barnsley: Seaforth. ISBN 978-1-84832-235-6.
