= HMS Welshman =

Minelayer

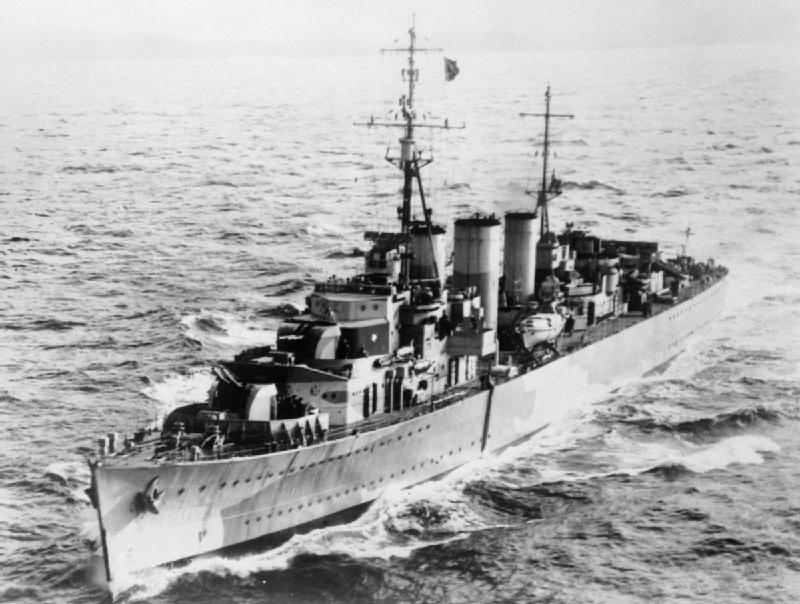
- HMS Welshman, 1942

History

United Kingdom
- Name: HMS Welshman
- Ordered: 21 March 1939
- Builder: Hawthorn Leslie, Hebburn
- Laid down: 8 June 1939
- Launched: 4 September 1940
- Completed: 25 August 1941
- Honours and awards: Malta Convoys, 1942
- Fate: Sunk, 1 February 1943
- Badge: On a Field barry wavy of six white and blue, a dragon rampant Red, supporting in the paws a trident Gold.

General characteristics
- Class & type: Abdiel-class minelayer
- Displacement: 2,650 long tons (2,693 t) standard; 3,415 long tons (3,470 t) full load
- Length: 400 ft 6 in (122.07 m) p/p; 418 ft (127 m) o/a
- Beam: 40 ft (12 m)
- Draught: 11 ft 3 in (3.43 m); 14 ft 9 in (4.50 m) full
- Propulsion: 4 × Admiralty 3-drum water-tube boilers; Parsons geared steam turbines; 2 shafts; 72,000 shp (53,690 kW)
- Speed: 39.75 knots (73.62 km/h; 45.74 mph); 38 kn (70 km/h; 44 mph) full
- Range: 1,000 nmi (1,900 km) at 38 kn (70 km/h; 44 mph)
- Complement: 242
- Armament: 6 × QF 4 in (100 mm) L/45 Mark XVI guns on twin mounts HA/LA Mk.XIX; 4 × QF 2-pdr L/39 Mk.VIII on quadruple mount Mk.VII; 8 × Vickers .50 machine guns on quadruple mount Mk.I (later up to 12 × 20 mm Oerlikons on single mounts P Mk.III or twin mounts Mk.V); 156 × naval mines

Service record
- Part of: Home Fleet; Force H
- Operations: Malta Convoys; Operation Torch

HMS Welshman was an Abdiel-class minelayer of the Royal Navy, launched in September 1941. During World War II she served with the Home Fleet carrying out minelaying operations, before being transferred to the Mediterranean Fleet in mid-1942 for the Malta Convoys. She also saw service during Operation Torch. The ship was torpedoed and sunk off Tobruk by the German submarine U-617 on 1 February 1943, with the loss of 157 lives.

== Service history ==
=== Home Fleet, 1941–1942 ===
Commissioned in late August 1941, Welshman sailed to Scapa Flow to join the Home Fleet, before assignment to the 1st Minelaying Squadron at the Kyle of Lochalsh in September. She conducted minelaying operations in the waters off western Scotland before being detached in December for deployment in the Bay of Biscay.

In January 1942, she transported stores and personnel to Gibraltar, Freetown and Takoradi before deploying to the Strait of Dover in early February to lay mines across the routes likely to be used in the event of a breakout by German battleships Gneisenau and Scharnhorst. After a refit, Welshman resumed minelaying operations in the Bay of Biscay in April.

=== Force H, 1942–1943 ===
In May 1942, she sailed to the Mediterranean to join Force H in the Malta Convoys. On 8 May Welshman sailed from Gibraltar, disguised as a French destroyer, with 240 tons of stores and RAF personnel aboard, in "Operation Bowery". She was sighted by enemy aircraft the next day, but her deception succeeded. On entering the Grand Harbour at Malta on 10 May she detonated two mines with her paravanes, sustaining some damage. She returned to Gibraltar on 12 May, and sailed to the UK for repairs at Yarrows at Scotstoun, returning to Gibraltar at the end of the month.

On 11 June, Welshman sailed for Malta as part of the relief convoy in Operation Harpoon. The next day she left the convoy and proceeded alone. After discharging her cargo at Malta on 15 June, she rejoined the convoy which was under heavy attack from Axis aircraft and Italian warships. The next day she returned to Malta with the two surviving merchant ships and their escort. The ship then returned to Gibraltar, and then to Scotstoun for repairs.

On 13 July, the ship rejoined Force H at Gibraltar, sailing for Malta once again in Operation Pinpoint the next day. She arrived at Malta on 16 July and returned to Gibraltar on 21 July, despite attempts by Italian ships and aircraft to intercept her.

In August, she took part in another fiercely contested Malta convoy, Operation Pedestal. She arrived on 16 August, then was transferred to the Eastern Mediterranean in September. In October, she made another voyage to Malta with Force H, delivering aircraft in Operation Train and returning to Gibraltar on 2 November. Welshman then supported the Allied landings in North Africa in Operation Torch. In December, she conducted minelaying operations off Haifa.

In January 1943, Welshman transported stores, including 150 tons of seed potatoes, to Malta before carrying out minelaying operations in the Skerki Channel, across the Axis evacuation route from Tunisia. She also transferred troops from Beirut to Famagusta, Cyprus.

=== Sinking ===
On 1 February 1943, while transporting stores and personnel to Tobruk, she was hit by a torpedo fired by U-617, commanded by Albrecht Brandi. Two hours later she sank east of Tobruk in position 32°12′N 24°52′E, with the loss of 155 lives. The survivors were rescued by destroyers Tetcott and Belvoir and taken to Alexandria.

== Bibliography ==
- Caruana, Joseph (2012). "Emergency Victualling of Malta During WWII". Warship International. LXIX (4): 357–364. ISSN 0043-0374.
- Nicholson, Arthur (2015). Very Special Ships: Abdiel-Class Fast Minelayers of World War Two. Barnsley, UK: Seaforth Publishing. ISBN 978-1-84832-235-6.
