= HMS Manxman (M70) =

Minelayer

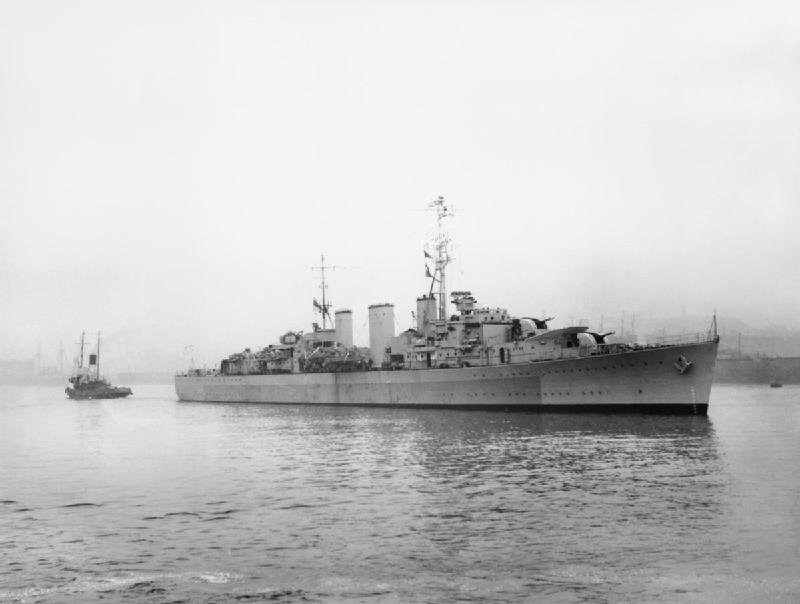
- Manxman in June 1945

History

United Kingdom
- Name: HMS Manxman
- Namesake: SS Manxman
- Ordered: 21 December 1938
- Builder: Alexander Stephen and Sons
- Laid down: 24 March 1939
- Launched: 5 September 1940
- Commissioned: 20 June 1941
- Motto: Stabit quoconque jeceris; (Latin: "It will stand, however you throw it")
- Honours and awards: Malta Convoys 1941–1942
- Fate: Scrapped October 1972
- Badge: On a Field Blue, Three legs conjoined in armour Proper, spurred and garnished Gold. It is also the manx symbol

General characteristics
- Class & type: Abdiel-class minelayer
- Displacement: 2,650 long tons (2,693 t) standard; 3,415 long tons (3,470 t) full (1938 group)
- Length: 400 ft 6 in (122.07 m) p/p; 418 ft (127 m) o/a
- Beam: 40 ft (12 m)
- Draught: 11 ft 3 in (3.43 m); 14 ft 9 in (4.50 m) full
- Propulsion: 4 × Admiralty 3-drum water-tube boilers; Parsons geared steam turbines; 2 shafts; 72,000 shp (54,000 kW)
- Speed: 40 knots (standard); 38 knots (70 km/h; 44 mph) (full)
- Range: 1,000 nmi (1,900 km) at 38 knots
- Complement: 242
- Armament: 6 × QF 4 in (100 mm) L/45 Mark XVI guns on twin mounts HA/LA Mk.XIX; 4 × QF 2 pdr L/39 Mk.VIII on quadruple mount Mk.VII; 8 × Vickers .50 machine guns on quadruple mount Mk.I (later up to 12 × 20 mm Oerlikons on single mounts P Mk.III or twin mounts Mk.V); 156 mines

HMS Manxman (M70) was an Abdiel-class minelayer of the Royal Navy. Large and fast, with extensive anti-aircraft defences it was designed to lay minefields in enemy waters close to harbours or across shipping lanes. The ship is named for an inhabitant of the Isle of Man. It served in the Mediterranean during World War II, minelaying and as a fast supply vessel to Malta. It was damaged by torpedo at the end of 1942 and did not return to service until just before the end of the war

Post war, Manxman was used as a headquarters ship during the Suez Crisis. Later converted to a minesweeper support vessel, Manxman was stationed in Singapore. After a fire it entered the Reserve Fleet and was scrapped in 1972.

== Second World War ==
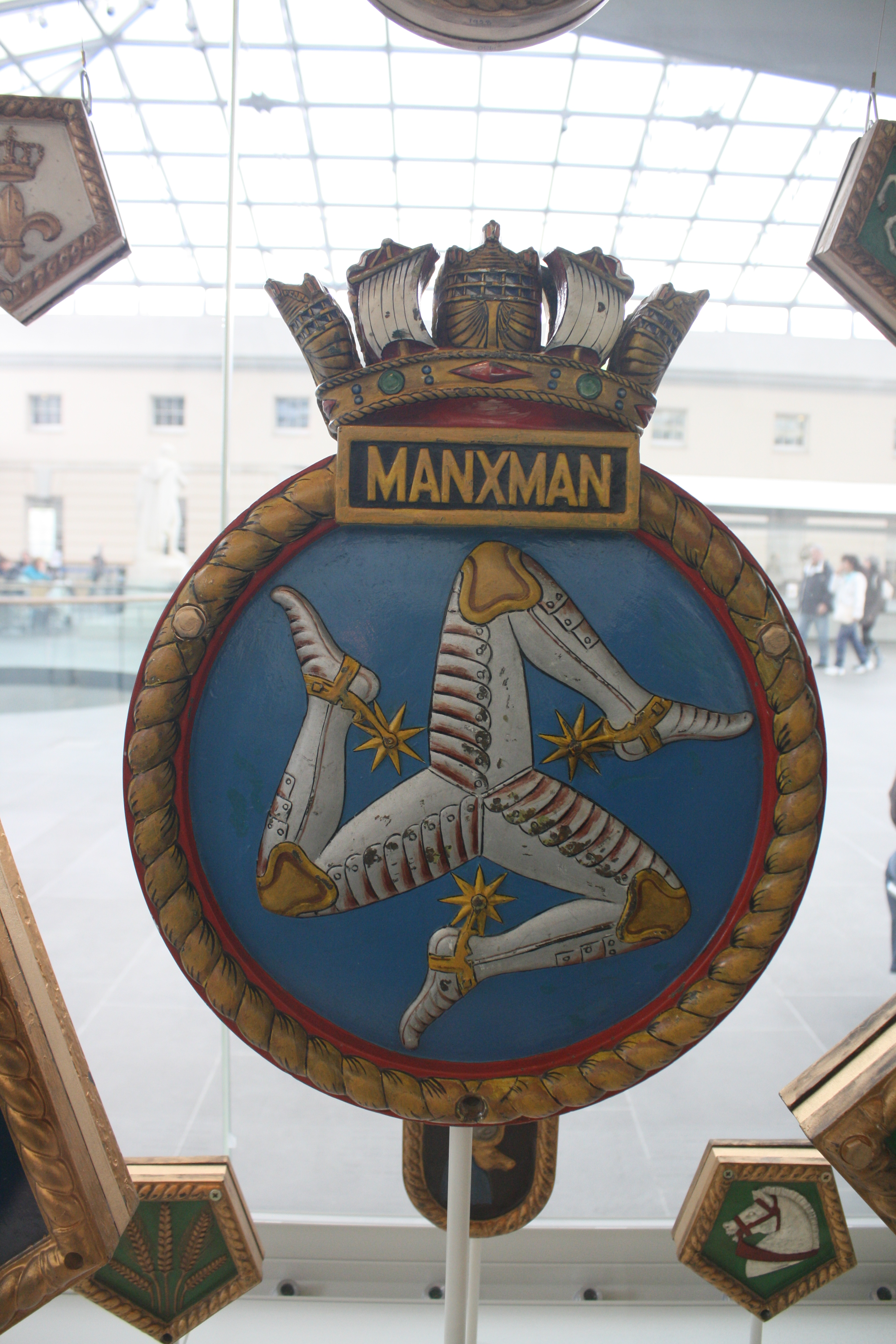
Ship's badge in the National Maritime Museum

Commissioned on 7 June 1941, her first mission was the delivery of mines to Murmansk. Manxman then transferred to the Mediterranean, where she was employed on relief runs to Malta. In August she took part in Operation Mincemeat, which involved mine-laying in the Gulf of Genoa while disguised as the French destroyer Léopard. From October 1941 to February 1942, Manxman was returned to the Home Fleet and took part in a number of mine-laying operations in the North Sea and the English Channel. In March, she joined the Eastern Fleet at Kilindini in the Indian Ocean. After escort and patrol duties, on 8 October she participated in the assault and capture of the island of Nosy Be on the north west coast of Madagascar, which was occupied by Vichy French forces.

Transferring to the Mediterranean again, Manxman was sent with supplies to Malta, followed by mine-laying in the Sicilian Channel. On 1 December, whilst in transit from Algiers to Gibraltar, she was torpedoed by U-375 and severely damaged at the position 36°39′N 0°15′E. Following emergency repairs at Oran and Gibraltar, she returned to Newcastle-upon-Tyne for extensive repair work. Manxman was re-commissioned on 10 April 1945 and made ready to join the British Pacific Fleet. The ship did not reach Colombo until 14 July, and was in Melbourne, Australia, on Victory over Japan Day.

== Post-war ==
The ship remained in Australia until June 1946, then underwent repairs at Chatham back in England before returning to the far East from February to December 1947. Following a refit, Manxman joined the Mediterranean Fleet in 1951. In 1953, she appeared in the film Sailor of the King as the German cruiser Essen. She was fitted for the film with enlarged funnels and mock-up triple-gun turrets over her 4-inch guns. The "torpedo damage" which forces her delay at "Resolution Island" was painted on the side of her port bow. The scenes when she is holed up for repairs were filmed in the semi-circular Dwejra bay, guarded by Fungus Rock on the west coast of Gozo Island in Malta. In 1953 she also took part in the Fleet Review to celebrate the Coronation of Queen Elizabeth II.

In 1956, Manxman was deployed for headquarters duties during the Suez Crisis operation. She is said to have outrun an American Carrier Group during the Suez Crisis of 1956. Manxman reportedly shadowed them; the US Admiral increased speed, eventually to over thirty knots – and then Manxman swept past at full speed, showing the signal "See you in Egypt". It is far from clear whether this episode happened; 'knowledge' about it was common in the Merchant Navy of the 1970s. This story was often told in the Royal Navy (not the Merchant Navy which is not technically an organisation), long before 1956; it was supposed to have happened in the Pacific at the end of World War II.

== In reserve at Malta and refitting ==
She was refitted in Chatham in the early 60s and converted to a minesweeper support vessel. When the forward boiler was removed and the compartment was fitted with diesel generators to supply outboard power to minesweepers, she was fitted with a dummy forward funnel, which housed the diesel exhausts and ventilation for the compartment. Much of the mine stowage was removed to make way for additional accommodation. Commissioning in 1963, she was subsequently stationed at Singapore Naval Base. During her time in Singapore, she was sent to patrol the waters around Sebatik Island, guarding against Indonesian military units during the Indonesia–Malaysia confrontation.

Returning to the UK in 1968, Manxman was used for engineering training at Devonport and following a fire, was transferred to the reserve at Chatham Dockyard until broken up at Newport in 1973.

== Bibliography ==
- Caruana, Joseph (2012). "Emergency Victualling of Malta During WWII". Warship International. LXIX (4): 357–364. ISSN 0043-0374.
- Nicholson, Arthur (2015). Very Special Ships: Abdiel-Class Fast Minelayers of World War Two. Barnsley, UK: Seaforth Publishing. ISBN 978-1-84832-235-6.
- Worth, Jack (1986). British Warships Since 1945: Part 4: Minesweepers. Liskeard, UK: Maritime Books. ISBN 0-907771-12-2.
