= Leslie Cole (artist) =

British artist and teacher (1910–1976)

- 1958 self portrait
- Born: 11 August 1910; Swindon, England
- Died: 1976 (aged 65–66)
- Education: Swindon Art School; Birmingham College of Art; Royal College of Art
- Occupations: Teacher and artist
- Partner: Brenda Harvey aka Barbara Harris

Leslie James Cole (11 August 1910 – 1976) was a British artist and teacher. He served as a war artist from 1942 to 1946 during which time he recorded events in several theatres of war and also the aftermath of the liberation of the Bergen-Belsen concentration camp.

== Early life ==
Cole was born in Swindon in 1910 and studied lithography and murals at Swindon Art School between 1927 and 1932 before attending Birmingham College of Art for a year. In 1934 he enrolled at the Royal College of Art, where he obtained a diploma in mural decoration, fabric painting and lithography in 1937. He exhibited with the lithography group, the Senefelder Club in 1934 and in 1937 he began teaching at Hull College of Art.

== Second World War ==
When the Second World War broke out, Cole joined the RAF but was discharged on medical grounds. Cole continued teaching and attempted to obtain work as a war artist from Sir Kenneth Clark and the War Artists' Advisory Committee (WAAC), but was refused at first. In order to impress Clark, Cole took a leave of absence from teaching at Hull to accompany a trawler assigned to coastal minesweeper work and also to sail aboard a destroyer on Gibraltar convoy duties.

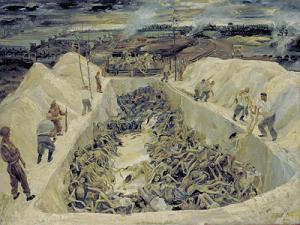
Death pits at Bergen-Belsen (1945)

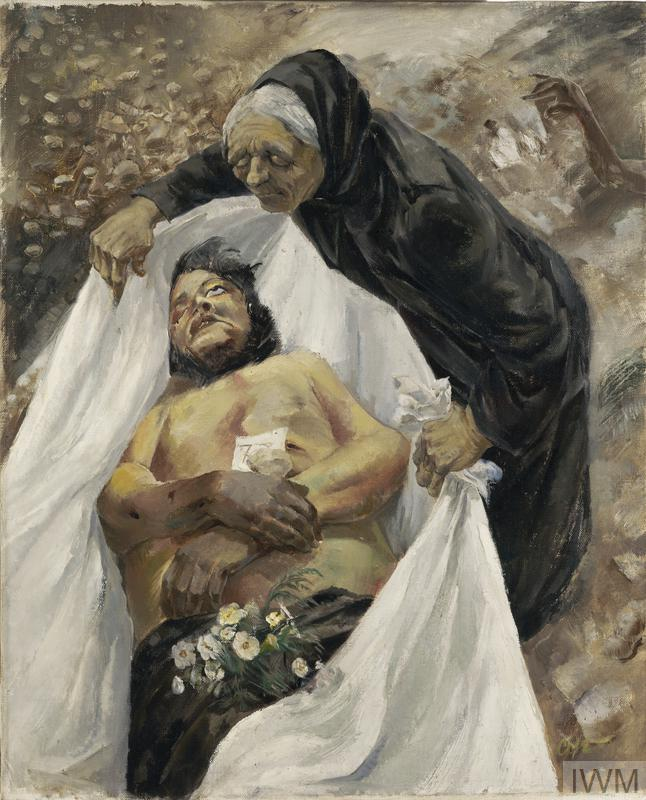
Mother Mourning the Death of a Village Priest (1945) (Art.IWM ART LD 5042)

In 1943 Cole was awarded his first full-time WAAC commission and went on to become one of the Committee's most productive artists. His first commissions included depicting a communal kitchen in Hull and the manufacture of military equipment in Swindon. In May 1943, after many delays, he went to Malta where he observed the end of the German siege of the island. As well as depicting the impact of the siege on the civilian population, Cole took part in Operation Corkscrew, the Allied action to recover the island of Pantelleria. Cole returned to Hull in November 1943 and taught there until July 1944 when he was given his second WAAC commission. He went to France and spent time with the Royal Marines in Normandy before moving to Cairo in December 1944 and then onto Greece the next month. In Greece, he painted several scenes of violence and destruction as the ELAS resistance movement fought other factions after the German withdrawal.

Clark and the WAAC committee were impressed with the unflinching way Cole had dealt, in his pictures, with the violence he had witnessed in Greece and assigned him to record the aftermath of the liberation of the Bergen-Belsen concentration camp. Arriving at the camp, eight days after the first Allied troops, Cole produced three large, panoramic oil paintings of survivors, British troops and captured German guards.

From May 1945, Cole was attached to the South East Asia Command and was sent to Singapore and then Burma, which he reached in May 1945. Cole went on jungle patrols with a unit of the Queen's Own Royal West Kent Regiment and met Burmese guerrilla fighters. In Pegu he met Thomas Hennell, another British war artist, and the two worked together for a short time. Cole made several paintings of liberated prisoners of war, including individuals who had lost limbs or were recovering from beriberi or from being starved. These works included prisoners from Changi Prison and also women and children who had been interned. Before returning to Britain, Cole also visited Borneo, where he was attached to a Gurkha regiment, and then Java.

== Later life ==
Cole did not complete his war artist commissions until 1946 when he moved to London and established a studio in Fulham. He exhibited regularly at the Royal Academy, the Royal Portrait Society and abroad. Cole found work teaching at the Central School of Art and also took a job teaching art at Brighton College of Art. He continued to paint but nothing he produced matched the intensity of his wartime work and there were reports of heavy drinking. Brighton College of Art was to become Brighton Polytechnic and Cole was still working there in 1976 when he died.

In 1938, Cole had married Brenda Harvey, who had been born Barbara Harris, an artists' model and a friend of Dylan Thomas. She had been a principal witness when Harold Davidson, the Rector of Stiffkey was defrocked for immorality with prostitutes. Barbara / Brenda sent a fourteen-page letter to the Bishop of Norwich about Davidson and gave evidence at Davidson's trial in 1932. A 2010 biography claimed that her past was only revealed to the family shortly before her death in 2003 and it appears that Cole was never aware of his wife's former role.

== Legacy ==
In 1985 the Imperial War Museum created an exhibition of Cole's War artist work, entitled To the Front Line. Two of his later paintings appeared on Antiques Roadshow in 2009 when their value was estimated at 6,000 pounds each by paintings expert Rupert Maas. Cole has 25 works in the Imperial War Museum as well as over 70 others which are in public collections in Britain.

In 2025 an exhibition in his home town was held by Museum & Art Swindon titled Leslie Cole: Recording Conflict. This combined works from the museum's own collection by Cole and his contemporaries together with loans from the Imperial War Museum.
