= Rosemary Portal, 2nd Baroness Portal of Hungerford =

British peeress and politician

The Right Honourable The Baroness Portal of Hungerford

Member of the House of Lords
- In office 26 April 1972 – Hereditary Peerage

Personal details
- Born: Rosemary Ann Portal; 12 May 1923 Grantham, Lincolnshire, England
- Died: 29 September 1990 (aged 67) West Sussex, England
- Resting place: St Mary's Churchyard, Funtington
- Parents: Charles Portal, 1st Viscount Portal of Hungerford (father); Joan Margaret Welby (mother)

Military service
- Allegiance: United Kingdom
- Branch/service: Royal Air Force
- Unit: Women's Auxiliary Air Force
- Battles/wars: World War II

Rosemary Ann Portal, 2nd Baroness Portal of Hungerford (12 May 1923 – 29 September 1990) was a British politician and hereditary peeress. In 1971, she inherited the Portal barony of Hungerford from her father. She sat as a crossbencher in the House of Lords from 1972 to 1990.

== Early life and family ==
Lady Portal of Hungerford was born on 12 May 1923 in Grantham, Lincolnshire to Charles Frederick Algernon Portal and Joan Margaret Welby Portal. Her father's family were members of the landed gentry and were of Huguenot descent. Her paternal grandfather, Edward Robert Portal, was a country gentleman and former barrister. Her paternal grandmother, Ellinor Kate Hill Portal, was the daughter of Captain Charles West Hill, who served as Governor of Winchester Prison. Lady Portal of Hungerford was the niece of Admiral Sir Reginald Portal and a distant relative of Wyndham Portal, 1st Viscount Portal and Abraham Portal.

In 1945, her father was created Baron Portal of Hungerford by George VI upon his retirement as Chief of the Air Staff, entitling her to the style The Honourable as the daughter of a peer. In 1946, her father was created Viscount Portal of Hungerford by George VI.

== Adult life ==
In the 1940s, she served as an officer in the Women's Auxiliary Air Force during World War II.

Following the death of her father on 22 April 1971, she inherited the Portal barony of Hungerford according to a special remainder, while her father's viscounty became extinct as it was only intended for male heirs to inherit. Upon the inheritance of the barony, she became styled The Right Honourable The Lady Portal of Hungerford.

On 26 April 1972, she was formally introduced, pursuant to Standing Order No.4 and under the Peerage Act 1963, into the House of Lords between the Baroness Emmet of Amberley and the Lord Platt.

She died on 29 September 1990 in West Sussex, at which point the barony became extinct. She was cremated, and her remains were placed in St Mary Churchyard in Funtington.
