= Baron Portal =

Baron Portal may refer to:

- Baron Portal, a title created in 1935 for Sir Wyndham Portal, 3rd Baronet; see Portal baronets.
- Baron Portal of Hungerford, a title created in 1945 for Charles Portal; see Baron Portal of Hungerford.
- Antoine Portal (1742–1832), French physician
- Pierre-Barthélémy Portal d'Albarèdes (1765–1845), French statesman
