= 442nd Regiment =

442nd Regiment may refer to:

- 442nd Infantry Regiment, United States
- 442nd Light Anti-Aircraft Regiment, Royal Artillery, Great Britain

== See also ==
- 442nd Regimental Combat Team Memorial Highway, a highway in California
