= Birmingham Rifles =

- Active: 20 October 1859 – 1 May 1961
- Country: United Kingdom
- Branch: Territorial Army
- Role: Infantry; Air Defence; Anti-Tank
- Garrison/HQ: Birmingham
- Engagements: First World War: Western Front; Italian Front; Second World War: Blitz; Burma Campaign

Commanders
- Notable commanders: William Gell

The Birmingham Rifles was a volunteer unit of the British Army founded in Birmingham in 1859. As the 5th Battalion, Royal Warwickshire Regiment, it served as infantry on the Western Front and in Italy during World War I. Its successor units served in air defence during the early part of World War II, and later as anti-tank gunners in the Burma Campaign.

== Volunteers ==
The enthusiasm for the Volunteer movement following an invasion scare in 1859 saw the creation of many Rifle Volunteer Corps (RVCs) composed of part-time soldiers eager to supplement the Regular British Army in time of need. One such unit was the 1st (Birmingham Rifles) Warwickshire RVC, formed on 20 October 1859 by Colonel the Hon Charles Granville Scott, formerly of the Scots Fusilier Guards, on behalf of the Lord Lieutenant of Warwickshire. Shortly afterwards Lieutenant-Colonel John Sanders, late of the 41st Bengal Native Infantry, assumed command. In March the following year it absorbed two other Birmingham-based units, the 3rd Warwickshire RVC raised on 8 November 1859, and the 6th raised on 8 February 1860. The whole was consolidated as the 1st Warwickshire RVC in March 1860 and the 'Birmingnham' subtitle was authorised by September. Further companies were raised, and the unit soon reached a strength of 12 companies, one recruited from newspaper workers, one from gunmakers, and another from Scots residents in the city. A cadet corps of the battalion existed at King Edward's School from 1864 to 1866, and again from 1883 to 1884. At first the uniform was grey with green facings, then Rifle green with red facings was adopted in 1863.

On 14 June 1871, retired Major-General John Hinde, CB, (1814–81) formerly of the 8th Foot, was appointed Lieutenant-Colonel Commandant of the Birmingham Rifles. On 4 March 1882 he was succeeded by Colonel William Swynfen Jervis, late of the Royal Munster Fusiliers, and one of the founders of Warwickshire County Cricket Club.

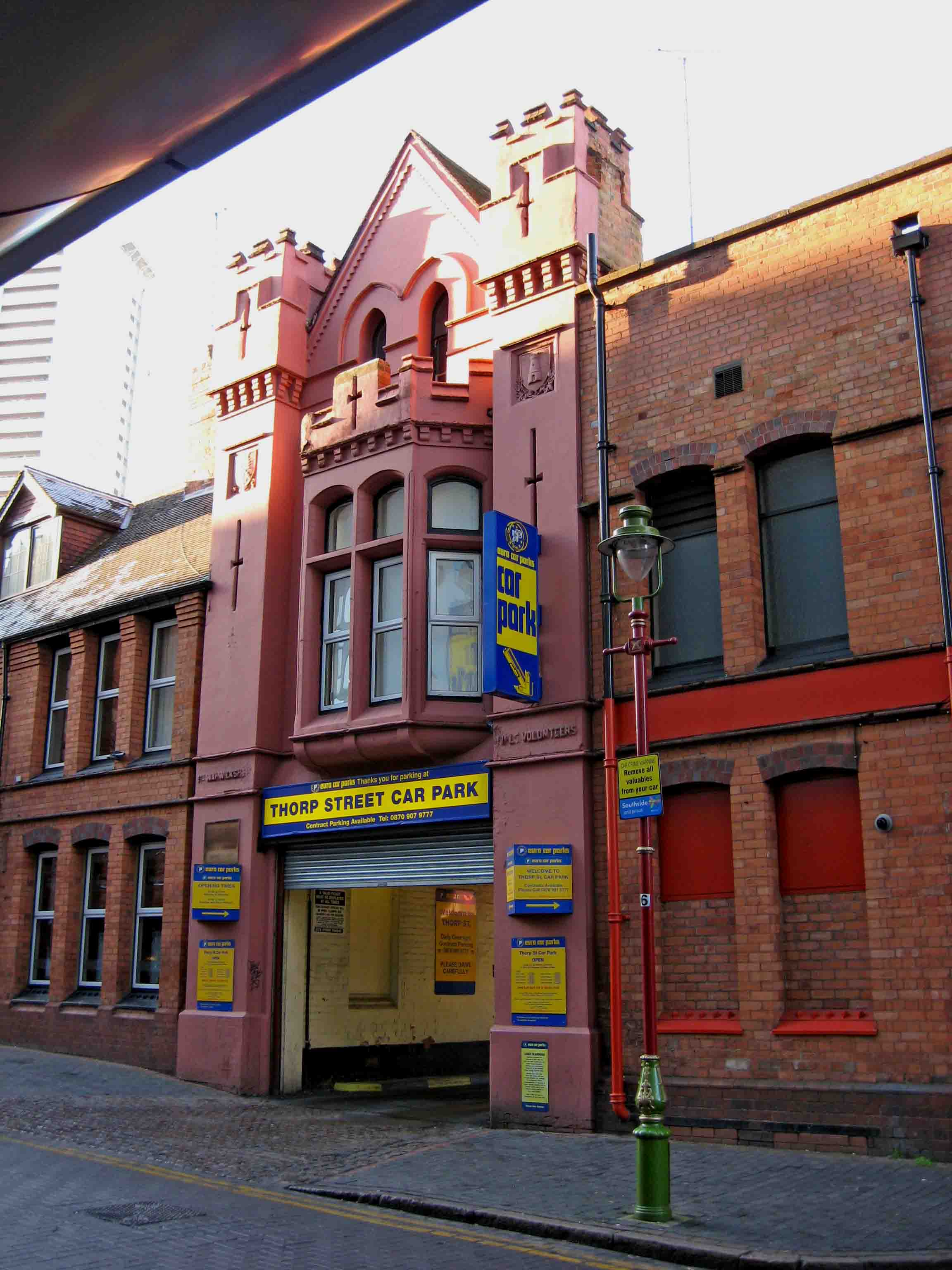
Thorp Street drill hall, now a car park

In its early months the battalion paraded at Beardsworth's Horse Repository, but as numbers grew it moved at the invitation of the Cattle Show committee to Bingley Hall. This arrangement was never satisfactory, because the battalion could not use the hall for the duration of the cattle show in November and December each year. When the show committee also let the hall to a circus for three months in the spring of 1879, the battalion was temporarily housed in Mr Wiley's factory in Graham Street. The battalion now acquired a site of its own and a drill hall was built at Thorp Street, which remained in use until 1968.

Under the 'Localisation of Forces' scheme introduced by the Cardwell reforms, the Volunteers in Warwickshire were grouped with the two Regular battalions of the 6th Foot (Royal Warwickshire Regiment) and the two Warwickshire Militia regiments into Sub-District No 28 (County of Warwick), forming Brigade No 28 (Warwickshire).

Following the Childers Reforms, the battalion became a Volunteer Battalion (VB) of the Royal Warwickshire Regiment on 1 July 1881, and was designated the 1st Volunteer Battalion of the regiment on 1 January 1883. Four new companies were added in 1891, the unit reorganising as a double battalion, the 1st Battalion having 'A' to 'H' Companies, the 2nd 'I' to 'Q' Companies. A cyclist section formed in 1894 had become a full company by 1900, together with 'U' Company formed of staff and students of Birmingham University. New cadet corps were formed at Solihull Grammar School and King Edward's School in 1904 and 1907 respectively.

The Stanhope Memorandum of 1888 proposed a Mobilisation Scheme for units of the Volunteer Force, which would assemble by brigades at key points in case of war. In peacetime the brigades provided a structure for collective training. The Volunteer Battalions of the Royal Warwickshire, Leicestershire, Worcestershire and Northamptonshire regiments were formed into a South Midland Volunteer Infantry Brigade, which in the event of war was to assemble at Warwick. Later, a separate Worcester and Warwickshire Volunteer Infantry Brigade was formed.

=== Commanding Officers ===
The following officers commanded the unit while it was part of the Volunteer Force:

- Col Hon C.G. Scott (September–November 1859)
- Lt-Col J.W. Sanders (1859–60)
- Lt-Col J. Oliver Mason (1860–67)
- Lt-Col C. Ratcliffe (1867–71)
- Maj-Gen J. Hinde, CB (1871–81)
- Col William Swynfen Jervis (1882–1900)
- Col W. Cox (1900–01; Lt-Col No 2 Bn 1891–1900)
- Col C.J. Hart, CB, VD, TD (1901–08; Lt-Col No 1 Bn 1900–01)
- Lt-Col W.R. Ludlow (No 2 Bn 1901–08)

== Boer War ==
The Volunteer Battalions provided service companies to serve alongside the Regulars during the Second Boer War. Despite the large number who volunteered, only a half company was sent from the two battalions of the 1st VB. The contingent left Birmingham on 17 January 1900 and joined the 2nd Bn Royal Warwickshires, taking part in six actions at Elandsfontein, Pretoria, Pienaarsport, Diamond Hill, Edendale and Belfast. The 58-strong detachment suffered seven casualties, all but one dying from sickness. The battalion earned its first Battle Honour: South Africa 1900–02.

== Territorial Force ==
When the Volunteers were subsumed into the Territorial Force (TF) in 1908 as part of the Haldane Reforms, the 1st and 2nd Battalions of the Birmingham Rifles became the 5th Battalion, Royal Warwickshire Regiment, and 6th Battalion, Royal Warwickshire Regiment, respectively and the cyclist company was disbanded, while 'U' Company and the cadet corps became part of the Officer Training Corps. The battalion adopted the red uniform with blue facings of the Royal Warwickshire Regiment. Both the 5th and 6th battalions were in the Warwickshire Brigade of the TF's South Midland Division.

== World War I ==
=== Mobilisation ===
On the outbreak of war in August 1914, the units of the South Midland Division had just arrived at Rhyl for annual training when orders recalled them to their home depots for mobilisation. 5th Battalion mobilised at Thorps Street under the command of Lt-Col A.I. Parkes. The Warwickshire Brigade first went to its war station at Portland. The division then concentrated around Chelmsford, where it formed part of Central Force. While the battalions trained for overseas service, so-called 2nd-Line battalions were authorised on 31 August to be formed at the home depots from men who either had not volunteered for overseas service or were unfit, together with the recruits flooding in. Thus the parent battalion at Chelmsford was designated the 1/5th Battalion, that at Thorp Street was the 2/5th Battalion. Later, a 3rd-Line or reserve battalion was also formed to train drafts for the other two.

=== 1/5th Royal Warwicks ===
The South Midland Division was selected to proceed to France to join the British Expeditionary Force (BEF) early in 1915. Lt-Col A.C. Stewart, Corps of Guides, took over command of 1/5th Warwicks in February 1915. The battalion embarked at Southampton for Le Havre on 22 March 1915. Within days it began learning the routine of trench warfare around St Yves, Messines and Ploegsteert. On 12 May, the division was designated the 48th (South Midland) Division and the brigade became numbered as the 143rd (1/1st Warwickshire) Brigade.

On 12 July 1915, Captain G.C. Sladen, Rifle Brigade, assumed command with the rank of Temporary Lt-Col. The battalion moved south to a section of the line around Hébuterne, Foncquevillers and Gommecourt.

==== Somme ====
The first offensive operation of the 1/5th Battalion, Royal Warwickshire Regiment was on 1 July 1916 at the Battle of the Somme. Together with 1/7th, the battalion held a two-mile stretch of trench adjoining the attack of 31st Division towards Serre. They were not to attack, but made simulated preparations for doing so. The enemy wire was cut, and they released smoke just before zero hour, but no assembly trenches had been dug nor was the British wire cut, and the German defenders were not fooled. 31st Division was dreadfully cut up, as was the rest of 143 Brigade, which had attacked with 4th Division.

During the Battle of Bazentin Ridge, the battalion captured Ovillers-la-Boisselle on the night of 15/16 July. The prospects for the attack were unpromising: the troops were exhausted before the attack and were suffering from the effects of lachrymatory gas shells; the men were too closely bunched and the waves too close together; and there was no artillery support. Nevertheless, in the dark, a party of the 1/5th Battalion led by Charles Carrington hit on a weak spot in the German defences with no machine gun cover, and captured a trench well behind the German main position without losing a man. Carrington persuaded his superiors not to withdraw his men, and the following morning the cut-off main German position surrendered.

The 1/5th Battalion was involved in the following further operations during the Battle of the Somme:

- Battle of Pozières Ridge, 23–27 July and 13–28 August 1916
- Battle of the Ancre Heights, 3–11 November 1916
- Battle of the Ancre, 13–18 November 1916

Lt-Col Sladen was promoted to command 143rd Bde, and Lt-Col C. Retallack was appointed to succeed him as CO on 4 September. By December the battalion occupied trenches at Le Sars. Casualties during the Somme campaign had been heavy. Company Serjeant-Major F. Townley was awarded the Military Cross (MC) after he had twice taken command of A Company when all the officers became casualties.

The 1/5th Battalion was involved in the following operations during the German Retreat to the Hindenburg Line in March and April 1917:

- Occupation of Peronne, 18 March 1916
- The battalion advanced on Épehy in April

==== Ypres ====
In July the battalion entrained at Authie for Proven in Belgium. After a short period of training it took part in the Third Battle of Ypres

- Battle of Langemarck, 16–18 August 1917: Serious losses were suffered in an impossible situation near St Julien; Lt-Col Retallack was severely wounded, leaving Capt W.H. Bloomer in temporary command
- Battle of Polygon Wood, 28 September–3 October 1917
- Battle of Broodseinde, 4 October 1917: Lt-Col W.C.C. Gell, who had assumed command in September, led another attack at St Julien, which was an outstanding success
- Battle of Poelcappelle, 9 October 1917

The battalion was moved to Vimy and returned to trench duty and rest periods.

==== Italy ====
On 10 November 1917, the 48th Division received orders to move to Italy. The battalion entrained at Ligny-Saint-Flochel; HQ and C Companies travelled via the Mont Cenis Tunnel, A, B and D Companies by the Riviera route. They detrained at Bovolone near Verona on 27 November. By 1 December the division had concentrated around Legnago on the Adige. On 1 March 1918, the division relieved 7th Division in the front line of the Montello sector on the Piave Front, and held the line until 16 March. On 1 April, it moved westward into reserve for the middle sector of the Asiago Plateau Front.

When the Austrians attacked the Asiago Plateau during the Battle of the Piave River on 15 June, 1/5th Bn was occupying the Cesuna re-entrant. The understrength D Company occupied the right front, with partly obscured fields of fire, while B Company on the left had good fields of fire. A and C Companies were in support between the Cesuna switch trench and Battalion HQ at Perghele Farm., a high promontory with steep clear slopes to the front and sides. D Company was quickly overrun and its commander captured. The neighbouring battalions were also driven back, opening a potentially dangerous breach in the line. When Battalion HQ went forward to investigate, the acting CO, second-in-command, adjutant and intelligence officer all became casualties, leaving Regimental Serjeant-Major Townley to take charge once more. He organised a defensive post of battalion cooks and orderlies at Perghele Farm, even though the farmhouse had been captured, and held out for 4 1/2 hours until relieved by a company of 1/6th Warwicks, while 1/7th Warwicks restored the line. The following day 143rd Bde went over to the counter-attack and regained all the lost ground. 1/6th Battalion was relieved on 17 June and went into reserve at Busibello where Lt-Col Gell returned to take command. The 1/5th Battalion took part in other engagements during August and September in the Mount Kaberlaba sector, returning to Granezza between each tour of duty.

At the end of October, the Austrians began to withdraw (the Battle of Vittorio Veneto) and 143rd Bde followed up along the Valle d'Assa, covering up to 14 miles (23 km) per day. Led by 1/5th Bn, it reached Osteria del Termine on 2 November, being the first British formation to enter enemy territory on the European fronts. The following day the 48th Division surrounded and captured a large force of Austrian troops including the corps commander and three divisional commanders. By 15.00 on 4 November, when the Armistice with Austria came into force, the division had pushed forward into the Trentino with 1/5th Bn at Faida. After the conclusion of hostilities the division was withdrawn to Italy for the winter.

Demobilisation for 1/5th Bn began on 23 December and parties left at intervals. On 3 April 1919, the residual cadre of battalion under Maj Bloomer marched through Birmingham from New Street Station to Thorp Street by torchlight. The battalion was formally disembodied on 2 May 1919.

=== 2/5th Royal Warwicks ===
The 2/5th Battalion, Royal Warwickshire Regiment was formed in Birmingham in October 1914, but at first the men lived at home, and little or nothing was available in terms of uniforms, arms or equipment. It was not until the 2nd South Midland Division concentrated at Northampton in January 1915 that the men were issued with .256-in Japanese Ariska rifles with which to train. Here they formed part of First Army of Central Force, but when the 1st South Midland Division went to France, the 2nd took its place at Chelmsford and became part of Third Army of Central Force, with a definite role in Home Defence. The battalions formed their machine gun sections while at Chelmsford, but the strength of the battalions fluctuated widely as they were drawn upon for drafts for their 1st-Line battalions. In August 1915 the division was numbered as the 61st (2nd South Midland) Division and the brigade became the 182nd (2nd Warwickshire) Brigade.

In February and March 1916 the units of 61st Division moved to Salisbury Plain to begin final training for overseas service. Here they were issued with .303 SMLE rifles in place of the Japanese weapons, and Lewis guns in place of dummy guns and antique Maxim guns. Final leave was granted in April and May and the division entrained for France, concentrating at IX Corps' rest area by 28 May.

The 2/5th Battalion's first action was the Battle of Fromelles on 19 July 1916, a diversionary attack in support of the Somme Offensive. The attack was badly handled and casualties were heavy. The 61st Division was so badly mauled that it was not used offensively again in 1916.

Thereafter, the battalion was involved in the following operations:

- Operations on the Ancre, 11–15 January 1917
- German Retreat to the Hindenburg Line, 14 March–5 April 1917
- Battle of Langemarck, 16–18 August 1917
- Battle of Cambrai:
  - German counter-attacks, 1–3 December 1917.

Due to the manpower shortage being suffered by the BEF, 2/5th Bn Royal Warwickshire Regiment was disbanded on 20 February 1918; some of the men being drafted into the 2/6th Bn, the rest into 24th Entrenching Battalion.

=== 3/5th Royal Warwicks ===
The 3/5th Battalion, Royal Warwickshire Regiment formed in Birmingham in May 1915 and joined the South Midland Reserve Group, moving to Weston-super-Mare in Somerset. It became the 5th (Reserve) Battalion, Royal Warwicks, on 8 April 1916, moved to Ludgershall, Wiltshire, and absorbed the 6th Reserve Battalion on 1 September that year, when the reserve group was entitled the South Midland Reserve Brigade in the Training Reserve. It spent the winter of 1916–17 at Cheltenham in Gloucestershire, moving to Catterick, North Yorkshire, by March. In the summer of 1917, it moved to Northumberland and remained in Blyth as part of the Tyne Garrison until the end of the war. It was disbanded on 17 April 1919 at Cramlington.

=== 18th Royal Warwicks ===
The remaining Home Service men were separated from the 3rd Line battalions in May 1915 and formed into Provisional Battalions for home defence. The men of the four TF Bns of the Royal Warwicks (5th, 6th, 7th and 8th) formed 81st Provisional Battalion in 10th Provisional Brigade.

The Military Service Act 1916 swept away the Home/Foreign service distinction, and all TF soldiers became liable for overseas service, if medically fit. The Provisional Battalions thus became anomalous, and on 1 January 1917 became numbered battalions of their parent units, the 81st becoming 18th Battalion, Royal Warwickshire Regiment, at Bath, Somerset, and transferred to 215th Brigade in 72nd Division. It moved to Bedford later in January, and then to Ipswich in May 1917. Part of the unit's role was physical conditioning to render men fit for drafting oversea, and 18th Royal Warwicks remained in the East Coast defences for the rest of its service. It was disbanded on 19 January 1918.

== Interwar ==
The 5th Battalion, Royal Warwickshire Regiment, was reformed on 7 February 1920 when the TF was reconstituted (retitled Territorial Army (TA) in 1921). Lieutenant-Colonel E.V. Sydenham, DSO, was appointed CO, with Maj W.C.C. Gell, DSO, MC, as second-in-command; Maj Gell succeeded to the command on 16 February 1924. Two companies of the battalion paraded at Thorp Street on Tuesday each week, the other two on Thursday, while 6th Warwicks paraded on Mondays and Wednesdays. Once again, both battalions formed part of 143rd (Warwickshire) Infantry Brigade in the 48th (South Midland) Infantry Division. At this period the 5th Bn had the Five Ways Grammar School Cadet Corps and Birmingham Cadet Corps, Jewish Lads' Brigade attached to it.

=== Anti-Aircraft conversion ===
90 cm 'Projector Anti-Aircraft', displayed at Fort Nelson, Portsmouth

In the 1930s the increasing need for anti-aircraft (AA) defence for Britain's cities was addressed by converting a number of Territorial infantry battalions into searchlight battalions of the Royal Engineers (RE). The 5th Royal Warwickshires was one unit selected for this role, becoming 45th (The Royal Warwickshire Regiment) AA Battalion, RE on 9 December 1936, consisting of HQ and four AA companies (378–381). At the same time, 6th Warwicks converted to 69th (Royal Warwickshire Regiment) Anti-Aircraft Brigade, Royal Artillery. Since the establishment of an AA battalion was much larger than an infantry battalion or an AA brigade, 69th AA Bde moved out of Thorp Street to Kings Heath, 379 Company to a new drill hall at Kingstanding, and 381 Company to one at Golden Hillock Road near the Birmingham Small Arms Company factory.

Both the new units were subordinated to 32nd (South Midland) Anti-Aircraft Group (later Brigade) in 2nd Anti-Aircraft Division.

In 1937, 45th AA Battalion formed an additional company at Birmingham, numbered 399. In November 1938 this company was transferred to the Royal Artillery (RA) to provide the cadre for a new 59th (Warwickshire) Searchlight Regiment, Royal Artillery. 45th AA Battalion was transferred to 34th AA Brigrade in 1938, but was in a new 54th AA Brigade by the outbreak of war.

== World War II ==
=== Mobilisation ===
The TA's AA units, including 45th AA Bn, were mobilised on 23 September 1938 during the Munich Crisis, with units manning their emergency positions within 24 hours, even though many did not yet have their full complement of men or equipment. The emergency lasted three weeks, and they were stood down on 13 October. In February 1939, the existing AA defences came under the control of a new Anti-Aircraft Command. In June, a partial mobilisation of TA units was begun in a process known as 'couverture', whereby each AA unit did a month's tour of duty in rotation to man selected AA and searchlight positions. The battalion was mobilised on 15 July and until 15 August it manned a S/L layout in the East Midlands. On 24 August, ahead of the declaration of war, AA Command was fully mobilised at its war stations, with 45th AA Bn manning 50 S/L sites around Birmingham by 27 August.

=== 45th Searchlight Regiment ===
==== Home Defence ====
On the outbreak of World War II, 45th AA Bn was assigned to a new 54th AA Brigade being formed at Sutton Coldfield near Birmingham, as part of 4th AA Division. The battalion established its HQ at Kingstanding Drill Hall, and the S/L sites were manned by 380 and 381 AA Companies, with HQs at Halesowen and Maxstoke Castle respectively. Meanwhile, 378 and 379 AA Companies manned Lewis guns in the Light Anti-Aircraft (LAA) role to defend various vital points (VPs), including Castle Bromwich Aircraft Factory, RAF Cosford, RAF Shawbury and RAF Ternhill.

By mid-December, the commitments at the VPs had been handed over to specialist LAA units, and the battalion was wholly engaged in S/L duties, with company HQs distributed as follows:

- 378 at Maxstoke Castle, later at Sheldon and then Shenstone during 1940–41
- 379 at Halesowen
- 380 at Shirley, with a temporary operational HQ at Hewell Grange in November–December 1940
- 381 at Pendeford Hill, later at Shenstone, Wightwick Hall, Weston Park and finally Arbury Park

In August 1940, the remaining AA units of the RE were transferred to the RA, the unit being redesignated 45th (The Royal Warwickshire Regiment) Searchlight Regiment, RA, and the AA companies becoming S/L batteries.

In a reorganisation of AA Command in November 1940, 54 AA Bde assumed responsibility for searchlight provision for the Gun Defence Areas (GDAs) of the West Midlands under a new 11th AA Division.

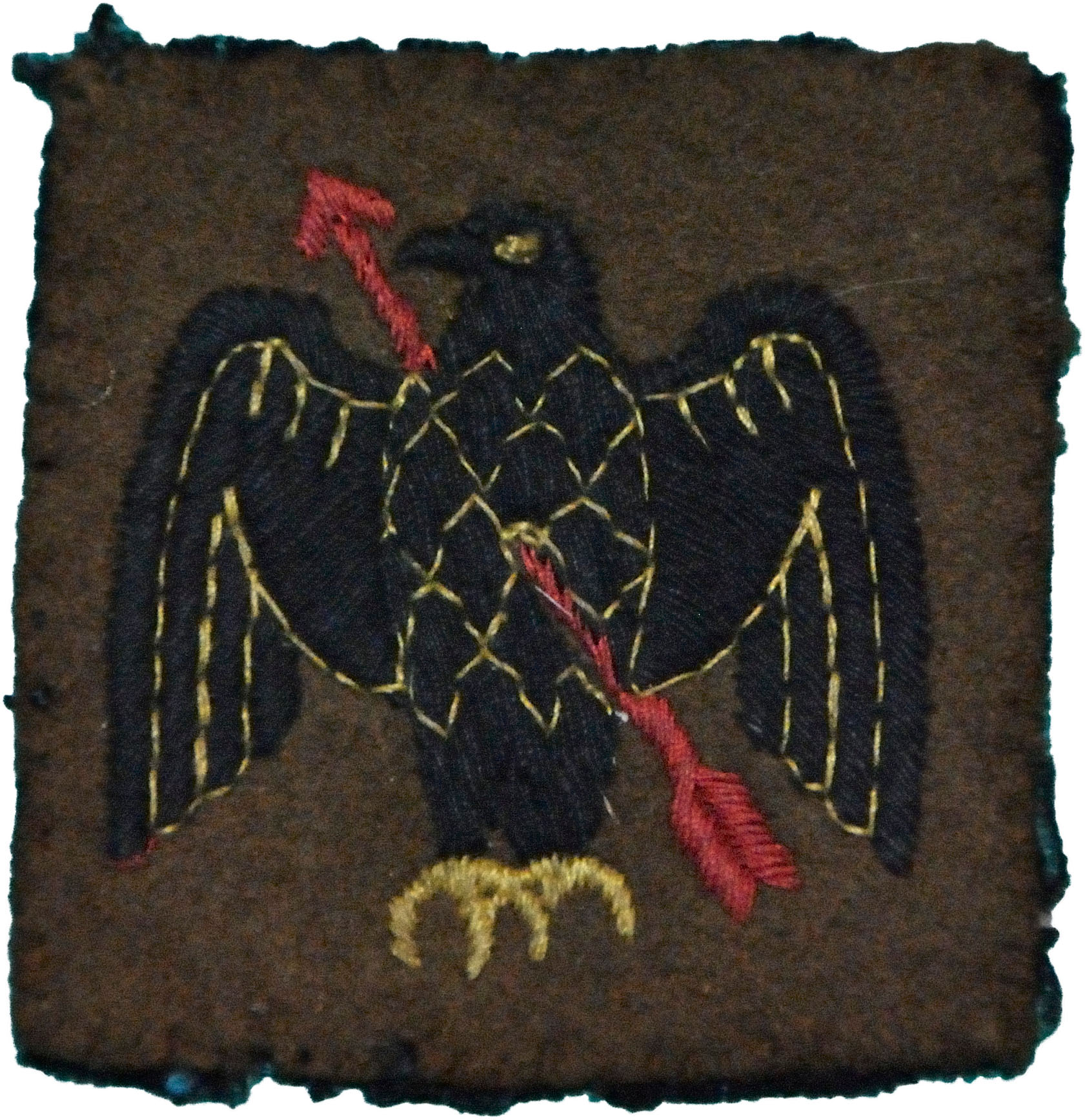
11th AA Divisional sign

After the initial deployment, the periods of greatest activity for 45th S/L Rgt were in August 1940, when it suffered five casualties in the first raids of the Birmingham Blitz, in November when there were heavy raids on Birmingham and Coventry, and again in March and April 1941.

The regiment supplied a cadre of experienced officers and men to 237th S/L Training Rgt at Holywood, County Down, where it provided the basis for a new 552 S/L Bty formed on 16 January 1941. This battery later joined a newly-forming 91st S/L Rgt.

The S/L layouts had been based on a spacing of 3500 yards, but due to equipment shortages this had been extended to 6000 yards by September 1940. In November this was changed to clusters of three lights to improve illumination, but this meant that the clusters had to be spaced 10,400 yards apart. Each S/L Troop manned two clusters. The cluster system was an attempt to improve the chances of picking up enemy bombers and keeping them illuminated for engagement by AA guns or Night fighters. Eventually, one light in each cluster was to be equipped with SLC radar and act as 'master light', but the radar equipment was still in short supply.

In May 1941, site BGo 31 at Shirley was credited with bringing down a Heinkel He 111 bomber. The Troop officer, Lt P.A.G. Osler, described how the Heinkel flew over the site four times, being illuminated by the lights and engaged with small arms fire (each S/L site was equipped with Lewis guns). After the fourth run the aircraft veered away and crashed into trees, where its bombload exploded. In June 1941, two S/L sites received direct hits and three men were wounded, but there was little activity of the rest of the year.

On 1 September 1941, Brevet Colonel A.W. Ward-Walker, TD, who had been Commanding Officer since 16 February 1934, relinquished command and was succeeded by Lt-Col C.D. Oliver, promoted from 44th (Leicestershire Regiment) S/L Rgt.

In 1941, the searchlight layout over the Midlands was reorganised, so that any hostile raid approaching the GDAs around the towns must cross more than one searchlight belt, and then within the GDAs the concentration of lights was increased. The regiment was undergoing redeployment in December 1941 when it was announced that it was being considered for conversion to the LAA gun role. This opportunity for greater involvement was welcomed by the regiment, which handed over its S/L sites to 80th S/L Rgt in December and January 1942.

=== 122nd Light Anti-Aircraft Regiment ===
A cadre of six officers and 30 other ranks went to Bradford for training on Bofors guns before the regiment formally converted on 2 February 1942 as 122nd (Royal Warwickshire) Light Anti-Aircraft Regiment, with the batteries renumbered as 400–403 LAA Batteries. The rest of the regiment went for training on 12 February and a month later the batteries moved from Bradford to various practice camps. In April they took over defence of VPs, three batteries in north Staffordshire and one on Anglesey, with RHQ near Chester.

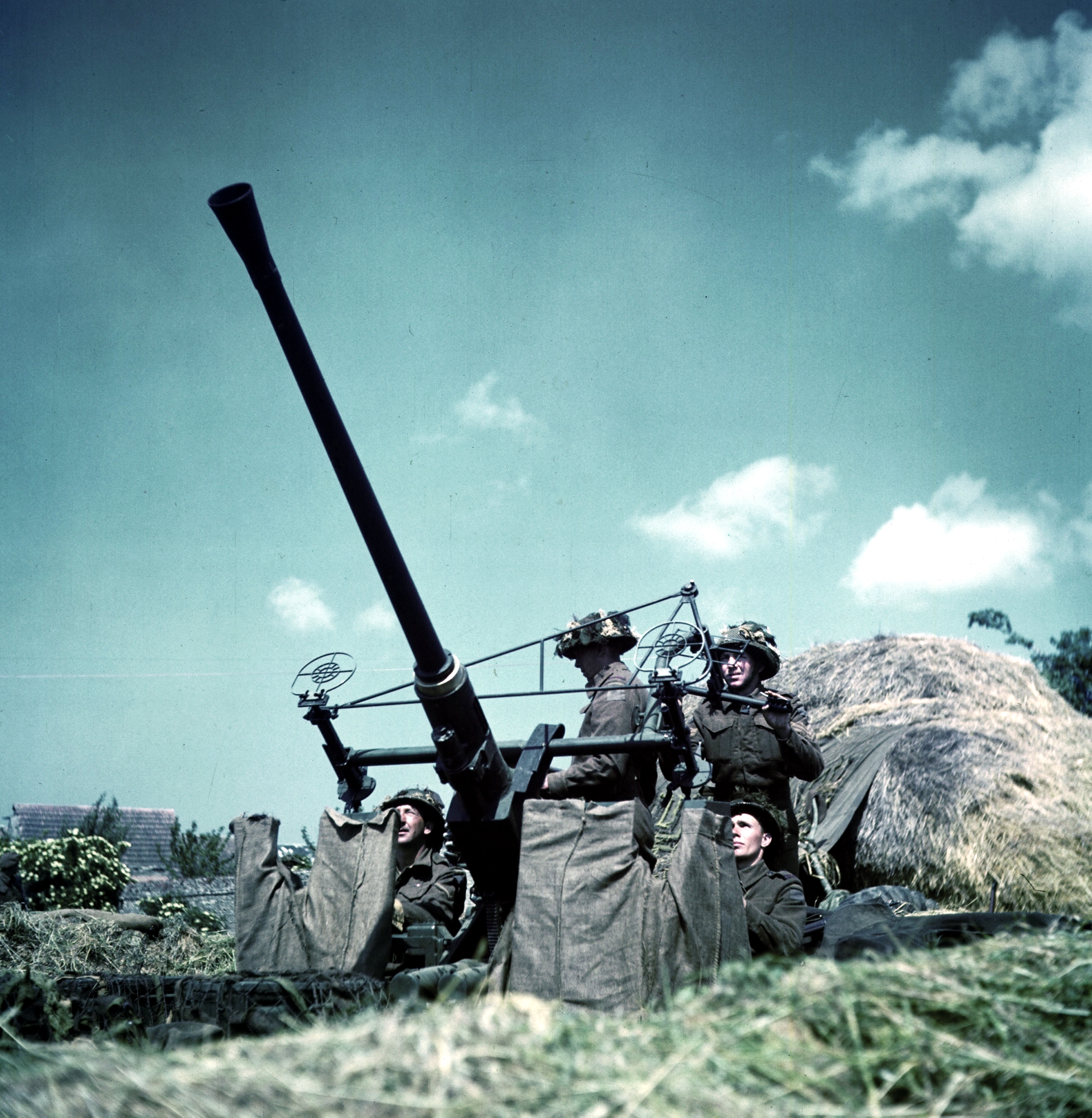
A Bofors gun featuring the 'Stiffkey Sight'.

During the spring of 1942, the Luftwaffe began a new tactic of 'hit and run' raids by single-engined Fighter-bombers against targets along the South Coast of England, and AA Command moved LAA units south to deal with this threat. In July, 122nd LAA Rgt moved from 54 AA Bde to join 71 AA Bde in Kent, deployed as follows:

- RHQ at Shepherdswell
- 400 LAA Bty at Rye, East Sussex
- 401 LAA Bty at Betteshanger
- 402 LAA Bty at Minster-in-Thanet, later at Rye, where it was awarded a Category 1 'kill' on 12 October
- 403 LAA Bty at Shepherdswell.

122nd LAA Rgt was now selected for overseas service. On 3 October, 403 LAA Bty was re-regimented with a newly formed 143rd LAA Rgt and the rest of the regiment, now with the three-battery organisation of a mobile AA unit, left AA Command and moved to Dropmore Hall, Burnham, Buckinghamshire, for battle training. A month later it went for mobile training at Leigh-on-Sea, Essex. While awaiting overseas postings, AA units were usually loaned back to AA Command, and on 22 December the regiment took over operational sites in Cornwall under 63 AA Bde, with RHQ at Perranporth and sites at RAF St Eval, St Austell and Porthcothan. In January–February 1943, it attended No 13 AA Practice Camp at Aberaeron, before coming under War Office Control. On 14 February, it moved to Leeds under orders to mobilise for a tropical climate.

==== India ====
The regiment embarked at Gourock on the Firth of Clyde on 10 March 1943 aboard HM Transport Strathnaver. It docked at Durban on 14 April and the regiment went into camp for six weeks before re-embarking on HMT Strathmore on 14 May, to land at Bombay on 10 June. The regiment then travelled across India to Ranchi to join 7th Indian Infantry Division. On 20 August the regiment moved to Khumbargaon and joined 36th Indian Infantry Division. Early in September the regiment received its lorries and Bofors guns and began intensive training. On 30 November the regiment underwent a major change in organisation and role. Two of its LAA batteries, 400 and the newly formed 'X' Bty, joined 100 (Gordon Highlanders) Anti-Tank Regiment, RA, and in exchange it received 168 and 321 A/T Btys (the latter being newly formed) equipped with 6-pounder A/T guns. The regiment was subsequently redesignated 122 LAA/AT Regiment.

36th Indian Division formation sign

The division was training for Operation Porpoise, a projected amphibious assault, but the opening of the Japanese offensive in the Arakan in February 1944 changed everything, and elements of the division (including 168 A/T Bty serving with 130th Field Rgt) were employed in mopping up after the attack had been stopped.

The amphibious plans were cancelled and, in May 1944, 122 LAA/AT Rgt moved by rail and riverboat to Shillong, where it was rejoined by 168 A/T Bty and where 36th Indian Division reorganised as a standard infantry division. Early in July 1944, infantry units of the division started to fly from Ledo into Myitkyina airfield in North Burma to reinforce the US-led Northern Combat Area Command. They saw much bitter fighting in the following campaign, but left the divisional artillery behind. However, 321 A/T Bty did move up to Ledo under the command of 178th Field Rgt, ready to move into the forward area; it returned to the regiment at Shillong in September. The division was recategorised as British on 1 September 1944, becoming 36th British Infantry Division.

=== 122nd Anti-Tank Regiment ===
==== Burma ====
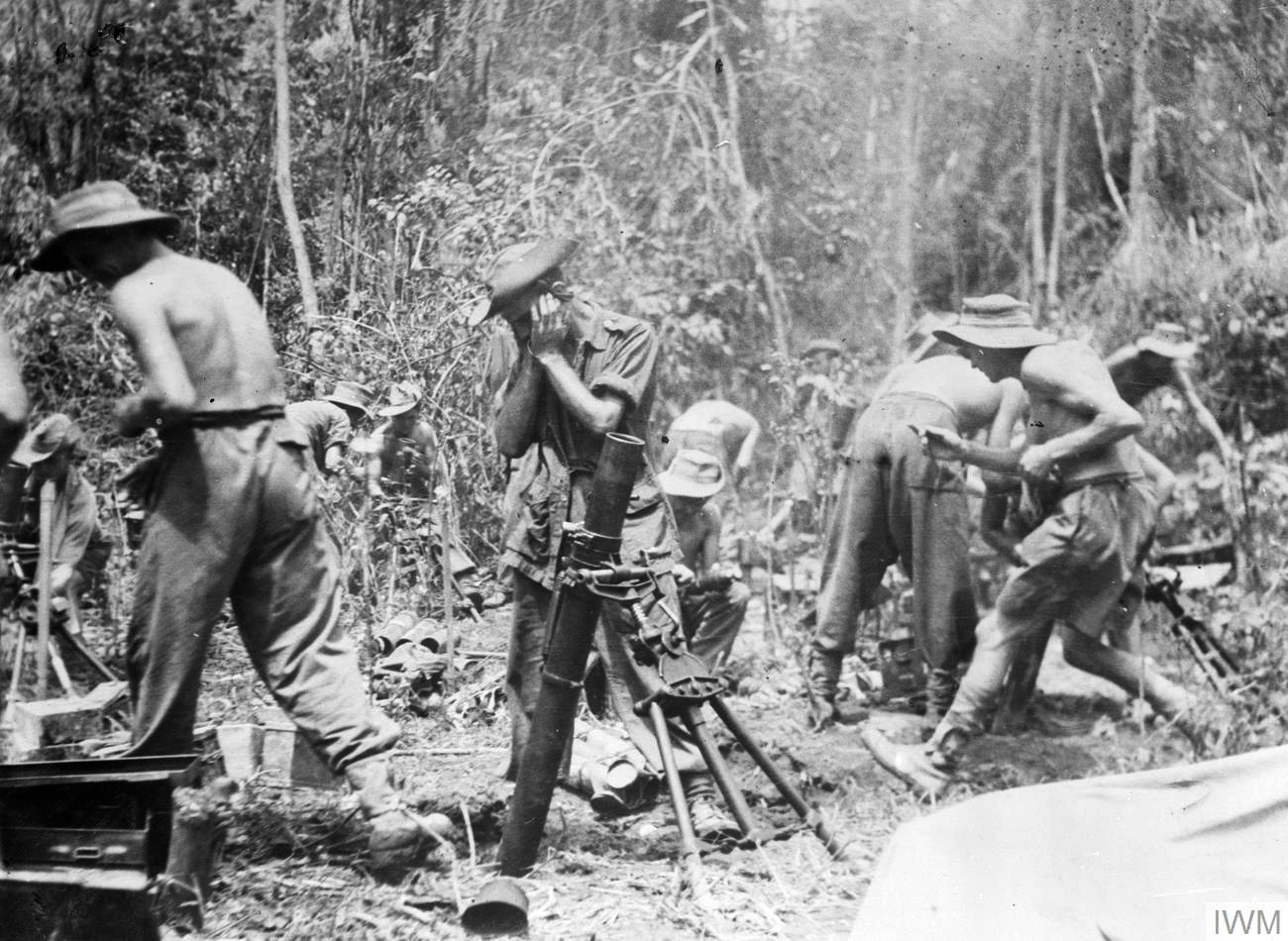
3-inch Mortar in action during the Burma Campaign.

Meanwhile, 122 LAA/AT Rgt was redesignated 122 (Royal Warwickshire Regiment) A/T Rgt on 14 September, and lost its LAA guns, reorganising into three batteries, each composed of twelve 6-pounder A/T guns and twelve 3-inch mortars, still commanded by Lt-Col Oliver. Once it rejoined, it served as the divisional anti-tank regiment in 36th Division until the end of the war.

On 29 October 1944, 168 Bty moved to Moran and three days later was flown to the forward area. Under the command of 26 Indian Bde it remained in contact with the enemy until the closing weeks of the campaign. It distinguished itself on 1–2 February 1945 supporting 2nd Bn The Buffs (Royal East Kent Regiment) at Myitson where an attempt to infiltrate over the Shweli River had miscarried, but suffered its heaviest casualties on 3 February.

The main body of the regiment (RHQ, F Troop of 321 Bty and 402 Bty) remained at Shillong until 12 November, when it was moved by road to the Ledo area and began intensive training. On 22 December, it left Ledo in convoy and moved up to join he forward troops of 36th Division. It crossed the Irrawaddy River between 13 and 16 January 1945.

During early February 1945, a further reorganisation took place: 168 and 402 Btys were now wholly equipped with 3-inch mortars, leaving only F Trp, 321 Bty, with 6-pounders. The regiment was now also engaged in the attempts to cross the Shweli, where the Japanese were well dug-in. It crossed between 25 February and 2 March, having fired 9500 mortar rounds and 120 6-pounder rounds in a month of supporting the infantry units held up on the far bank, sometimes dropping mortar bombs accurately only a few yards in front of them.

During the advance, 26th Indian Bde converged with the rest of 36th Indian Division on the Shweli River, until 168 Bty was back in touch with the regiment. It was relieved by 402 Bty on 12 March. During March and April, F Trp operated firstly with 72 Bde and later with 29 Bde at Thazi Township, frequently firing its A/T guns over the river into Japanese bunkers.

It was not possible to maintain all the divisions in Burma, and many troops from 36th Division were due for repatriation to the UK under the 'Python' scheme, having served in the Far East for longer than 3 years and 8 months. The division was therefore sent back to India. 122nd A/T Regiment was flown from Meiktila to Imphal and Chittagong, then began the long journey by road and rail to Poona on 6 May.

Once at Poona, the regiment rested and reorganised, while 36th Division where it went into training for Operation Zipper, the proposed amphibious invasion of Malaya. However, the war had ended with the Surrender of Japan on 15 August, Lieutenant-Colonel Oliver relinquished the command on 26 June, being replaced on 20 August by Lt-Col J.W. Calver from 21st West African A/T Rgt. The regiment was transferred from 36th Division to XV Corps at Coimbatore and re-equipped with 4.2-inch mortars in place of the 3-inch. Demobilisation began in October 1954 and the regiment was placed in suspended animation on 15 September 1946.

== Postwar ==
When the TA was reconstituted on 1 January 1947, the regiment reformed at Birmingham as 580 (The Royal Warwickshire Regiment) Heavy Anti-Aircraft Regiment, RA, with RHQ and two batteries at Thorp Street, and one battery at the Drill Hall, Shirley. It reverted to the LAA role in 1950 and about that time the subtitle changed to '5th Battalion, The Royal Warwickshire Regiment'. It formed part of 80 AA Brigade (the former 54 AA Brigade) at Sutton Coldfield. In 1952, one battery moved from Thorp Street to Taunton Road, Balsall Heath, and the battery at Shirley moved to Mossfield Road, Kings Heath. The following year a fourth battery was raised.

When AA Command was disbanded in 1955, there was a reduction in the number of AA units in the TA. 580 LAA Rgt was amalgamated with 469 (The Royal Warwickshire Regiment) HAA Rgt, 594 (Warwickshire) LAA Regiment and 672 (Worcestershire) HAA Regiment to form 442 LAA Regiment, Royal Artillery. (469 Rgt was the former 6th Battalion, Royal Warwicks, formed from the Birmingham Rifles in 1908, and 594 Regiment was the former 59th Searchlight Regiment formed in 1938 from a cadre provided by the 45th.) The new unit was organised as follows:

- RHQ and 'P (5/6th Royal Warwicks)' Battery at Thorpe Street – from 469 and 580 Regiments
- 'Q (Warwickshire)' Battery – from 594 Regiment
- 'R (Worcestershire)' Battery – from 672 Regiment

In 1961, 442 LAA Regiment was broken up: 'Q' Battery joined 268 (Warwickshire) Field Regiment, 'R' Battery joined 444 (Staffordshire) LAA Regiment. The remainder of the regiment (RHQ and 'P (5/6th Royal Warwicks)' Battery) were absorbed by the 7th Battalion, Royal Warwicks. This battalion had previously absorbed the 8th Battalion, so the lineages of all four TA battalions of the Royal Warwickshire Regiment were merged. C Company of 7th Bn was based at Thorp Street until the drill hall went out of use in 1968.

== Insignia ==
From 1947 to 1955, the regiment wore an arm flash in the form of a horizontal scarlet strip.

== Honorary Colonel ==
The following served as Honorary Colonel of the battalion:

- Col C.J. Hart, CB, CBE, VD, TD (Lt-Col Commandant 7 July 1901) appointed 8 October 1909, joint Hon Col of 5th and 6th Bns
- Col A. Parkes, TD, appointed 15 December 1921
- Lt-Col E.V. Sydenham, DSO, TD, appointed 17 February 1932
- Air Vice-Marshal W.C.C. Gell, DSO and bar, MC, TD, (1888–1969) former commanding officer, 1917 and 1924–29, appointed 16 February 1937; later Air Officer Commanding RAF Balloon Command

== Prominent members ==
- Charles Carrington (1897–1990), author of A Subaltern's War (1929) (as 'Charles Edmonds') and Soldier From The Wars Returning (1964); commissioned while under age, he served with the 1/5th Bn on the Western and Italian Fronts and won an MC.

== Battle Honours ==
The 1st Volunteer Battalion carried the Battle Honour South Africa 1900–02 awarded for providing volunteers for the service companies in the Second Boer War. During the Great War, the battalion contributed to the Honours of the Royal Warwicks. The Royal Artillery does not carry Battle Honours, so none were awarded to the regiment for its service during the Second World War.
