= William Gell (RAF officer) =

Royal Air Force Air Vice-Marshal (1888-1969)

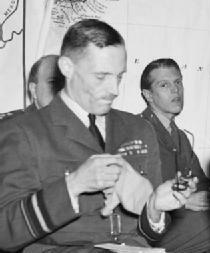
- Air Vice-Marshal Gell in 1944
- Born: 10 July 1888; Birmingham, England
- Died: 16 May 1969 (aged 80); Knowle, England
- Military career
- Allegiance: United Kingdom
- Branch: British Army (1911–39); Royal Air Force (1939–45)
- Service years: 1911–45
- Rank: Air Vice-Marshal
- Commands: Balloon Command (1944–45); No. 30 (Balloon) Group (1941–44); No. 6 Balloon Centre (1939–41); 5th/6th Battalion Royal Warwickshire Regiment (1917–19)
- Conflicts: First World War; Second World War
- Awards: Companion of the Order of the Bath; Distinguished Service Order & Bar; Military Cross; Territorial Decoration; Silver Medal of Military Valor (Italy)

Air Vice-Marshal William Charles Coleman Gell, CB, DSO & Bar, MC, TD, DL (10 July 1888 – 16 May 1969) was an officer of the British Army and then of the Royal Air Force. He served as Air Officer Commanding-in-Chief at RAF Balloon Command from 1944 to 1945.

== Early life ==
Gell was born in Birmingham the son of William and Catherine Gell. He grew up at 111 Gough Road, Edgbaston, where his father managed an umbrella factory. He was educated at Malvern College and Caius College, Cambridge where he graduated with an MA degree in law. On coming down from university, Gell returned to Birmingham to begin his legal career as a solicitor.

== Territorial Force ==
Gell's military service began in the Officers Training Corps (OTC), a standard route for a non-career commissioned officer: "William Charles Coleman Gell (late Cadet Serjeant, Cambridge University Contingent, Senior Division, Officers Training Corps) to be Second Lieutenant". (London Gazette). Once settled as a Birmingham solicitor, Gell joined a Territorial Force (TF) battalion of his local regiment, the Royal Warwickshire Regiment. Initially commissioned, on 12 May 1911, into the 7th Battalion, The Royal Warwickshire Regiment, he soon transferred, from 21 January 1912, to the Birmingham Rifles, more formally known as: 5th and 6th Battalions, The Royal Warwickshire Regiment.

== First World War ==
Gell served in the First World War and commanded the 5th/6th Battalion in France, earning the Military Cross as a lieutenant serving as temporary captain. Gell landed at LeHavre in France on 23 March 1915 with 1st/5th Battalion, Royal Warwickshire Regiment, he was wounded on the Somme in 1916 and from 3 October 1916 until 28 June 1917 was an acting major, Gell held command of 1st/5th Battalion Royal Warwicks from 23 August 1917, serving in France and Flanders until late 1918 and completing his service in Italy. On 1 January 1917 his bravery still as a lieutenant and acting captain during his service in France was rewarded with a rare appointment as a junior officer, to the Distinguished Service Order. Further brave conduct and successful leadership resulted in the award of a Bar to the Distinguished Service Order in June 1919 for his service as Acting lieutenant colonel commanding 1st/5th Battalion of the Royal Warwickshire Regiment in France and Flanders and finally Italy. The Italian government awarded him the Silver Medal of Military Valor.

== Between the wars ==
After service in the First World War, Gell returned to legal practice as a solicitor, being noted as "Mr. William Charles Coleman Gell, Solicitor, of 36, Waterloo Street, Birmingham,(a member of the firm of Johnson and Co., of the same place, Solicitors)" in the London Gazette in 1922. He continued to serve in the Territorial Army.

Gell married Edith Maud Gosling on 30 January 1923 in Maidstone.

On 26 August 1931 Gell, who was then living at the Croft, Blossomfield, Solihull was appointed Deputy Lieutenant (DL) for the County of Warwick.

While serving as a lieutenant-colonel in command of 5th Battalion, Royal Warwickshire Regiment, Gell was awarded the Territorial Decoration (TD) for his long and distinguished service in the Territorial Army. He joined the Anti-Aircraft branch of the Territorial Army in 1935. In 1937 he was appointed Honorary Colonel of the 5th Battalion, Royal Warwickshire Regiment, of which he had been commanding officer in 1924–29. The RAF List of July 1938 lists him amongst the military members of the "Territorial Army and Air Force Associations" of Warwickshire, recording Gell as honorary colonel of the 45th (Royal Warwicks) Anti-Aircraft Battalion, Royal Engineers. On 18 Jan 1939 Gell was appointed to a commission in the Auxiliary Air Force in the rank of wing commander as Officer Commanding, No 6 Balloon Centre, Auxiliary Air Force. The RAF List of August 1939 lists him as a wing commander in the Royal Auxiliary Air Force Balloon Section after barrage balloon operation was transferred from the Royal Engineers to the Royal Air Force.

== Second World War ==
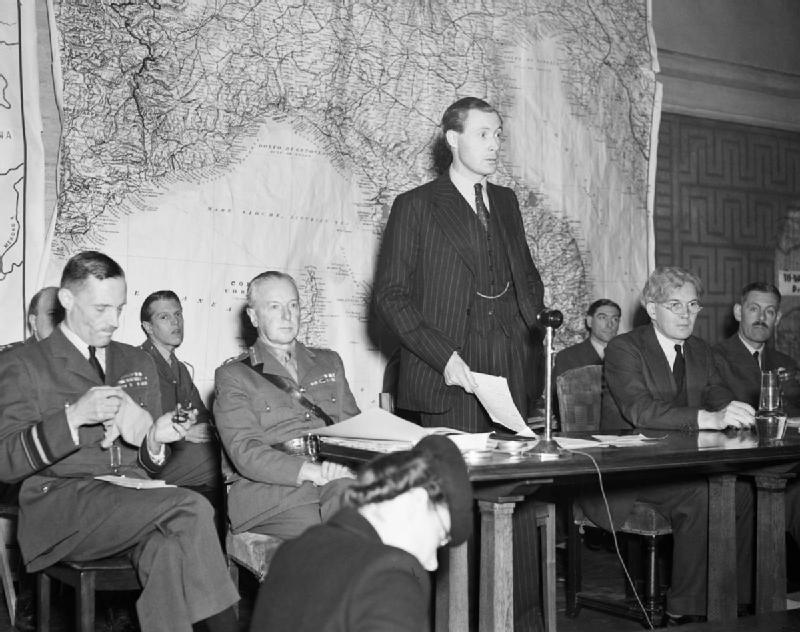
Air Vice Marshal Gell (far left), listens while Duncan Sandys announces the end of the German V-1 flying bomb campaign against London, September 1944

During the Second World War, Gell served as Officer Commanding No. 5 and then No. 6 Balloon Centre protecting against German air attacks. Gell was promoted to group captain in the Royal Auxiliary Air Force on 1 September 1940.

In January 1941 the RAF List shows him as the senior group captain in the RAF Balloon Section date 1 September 1940. He was appointed Air Officer Commanding No. 30 Balloon Group in 1941, promoted air commodore on 1 December 1943, and appointed Air Officer Commanding-in-Chief at RAF Balloon Command in 1944 before retiring in 1945.

Gell's success in command of Balloon Command protecting British cities and military and naval installations was rewarded in the Birthday Honours list of June 1944 with appointment as a Companion of the Order of the Bath.

== Edith Gell ==
Gell's wife, Edith Maud Gell (1896–1980), also had a career during the war, serving in the Auxiliary Territorial Service (ATS). She is recorded as having joined up on 19 September 1938, just ten days after the service itself was officially established, making her one of the first recruits to the Service. By March 1940, the mother of four was serving as a senior commandant, then the fourth most senior rank of officer in the service (another grade would later be inserted to match the rank-system of the men's services). On 30 May 1941, the ATS was made a formal part of the Army, subject to military law and military discipline. The women officers were all, whatever their ATS status, commissioned as second subalterns, the lowest rank of the new militarised-ATS system. The women were also given service numbers and though more senior women had been brought in to provide command experience for the rapidly-expanding Women's Services, Edith Gell was still the 36th most senior person in the ATS, as indicated by her number: 192036. Once formally commissioned into the reformed ATS, the women could be promoted through the new ranks and Mrs. Gell resumed her career in the new style of senior commander. By 1944, she was serving in the rank of chief commander and her six years of service to date were recognised with the award of a military OBE.

== Later years ==
Following wartime service Gell again returned to legal practice with Johnson and Co. in Birmingham a company he was still associated with in 1965.

Military offices
Preceded by Sir Leslie Gossage	Commander-in-Chief Balloon Command; 1944–1945	Succeeded by Philip Lincoln
