= Philip Lincoln =

Royal Air Force Air Commodore (1892–1981)

- Born: Philip Lionel Lincoln; 20 January 1892; Lee, London
- Died: 28 April 1981 (aged 89); Chatham, Kent, England
- Military career
- Allegiance: United Kingdom
- Branch: British Army; Royal Air Force
- Service years: 1914–1945
- Rank: Air Commodore
- Commands: 10th Bn Northumberland Fusiliers; No. 902 (County of London) (Balloon) Squadron; No. 34 Group; No. 30 Group; RAF Balloon Command
- Conflicts: World War I World War II
- Awards: Companion of the Order of the Bath; Distinguished Service Order; Military Cross

Air Commodore Philip Lionel Lincoln CB DSO MC (20 January 1892 – 28 April 1981) was a Royal Air Force officer who became the last Air Officer Commanding-in-Chief at RAF Balloon Command.

== RAF career ==
Educated at Framlingham College, Lincoln was commissioned into the Northumberland Fusiliers in 1914 and served in World War I as Commanding Officer of the 10th Bn Northumberland Fusiliers. Between the Wars he worked for R Passmore and Co. He joined the Auxiliary Air Force in 1938 and served in World War II as Officer Commanding No. 902 (County of London) (Balloon) Squadron and then as Air Officer Commanding No. 34 Group, Senior Air Staff Officer and Air Officer Administration at Headquarters RAF Balloon Command before becoming Air Officer Commanding No. 30 Group in 1944 and Air Officer Commanding-in-Chief at RAF Balloon Command in February 1945. He retired in August 1945.

He was also a judge for the Ski Club of Great Britain.

Military offices
Preceded by W C C Gell	Commander-in-Chief Balloon Command; February 1945–August 1945	Succeeded by Command disbanded
