= Statue of Charles Portal =

Statue in London, England

Coordinates: 51.5042°N 0.1237°W

Charles Portal, 1st Viscount Portal of Hungerford
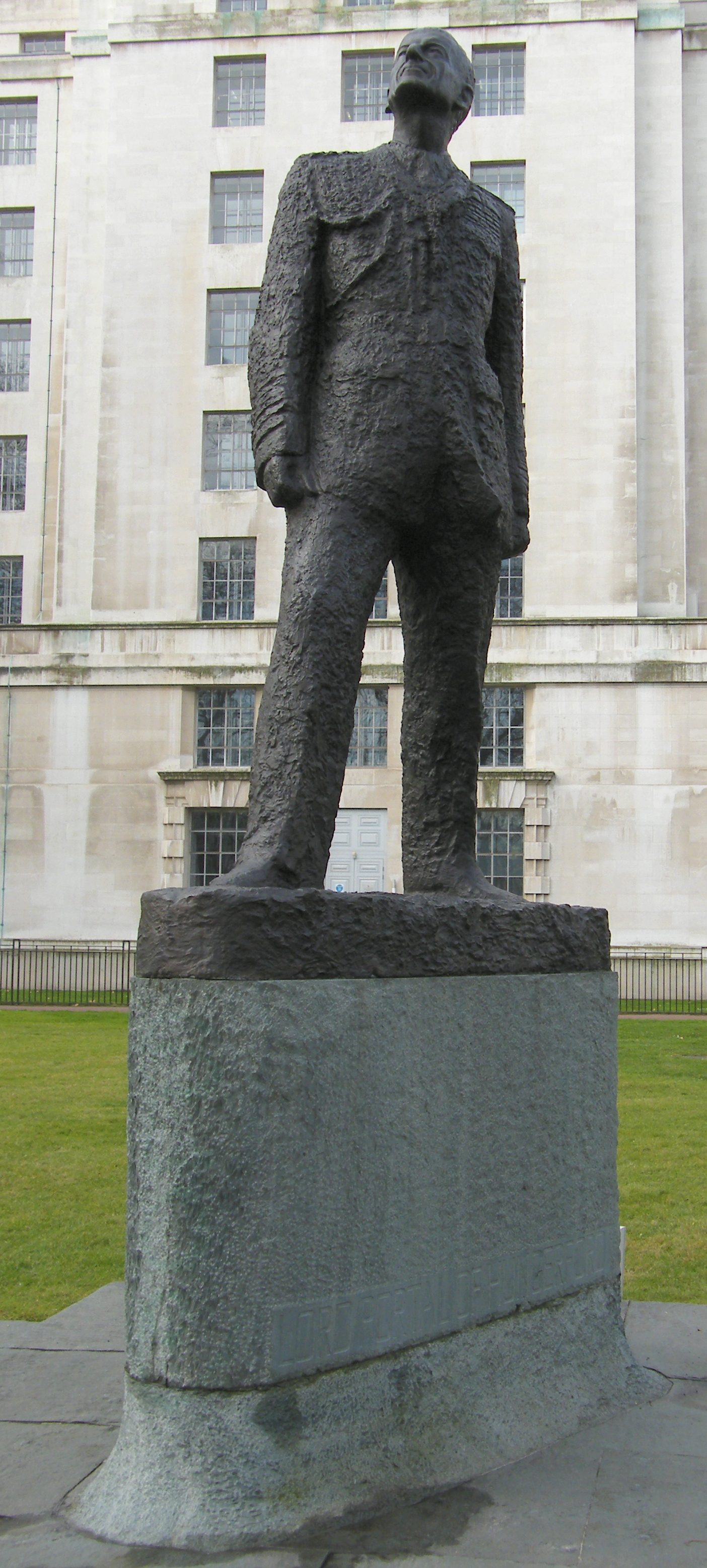
- Artist: Oscar Nemon
- Completion date: 1975
- Subject: Charles Portal, 1st Viscount Portal of Hungerford
- Location: London

The statue of Charles Portal, 1st Viscount Portal of Hungerford is a statue that stands in Victoria Embankment Gardens, outside the Ministry of Defence.

The statue was designed by Oscar Nemon and unveiled by Harold Macmillan in 1975. It depicts Charles Portal, who first had a decorated career during the First World War as part of the Royal Flying Corps. He would go on to serve as Chief of the Air Staff for a significant part of the Second World War. He is considered to be one of the most significant figures of British wartime command. With Eisenhower calling him "greater even than Churchill", and Churchill himself stating that "Portal had everything".
