= Leslie Gossage =

Officer in the British Army and Royal Air Force

Sir Ernest Leslie Gossage
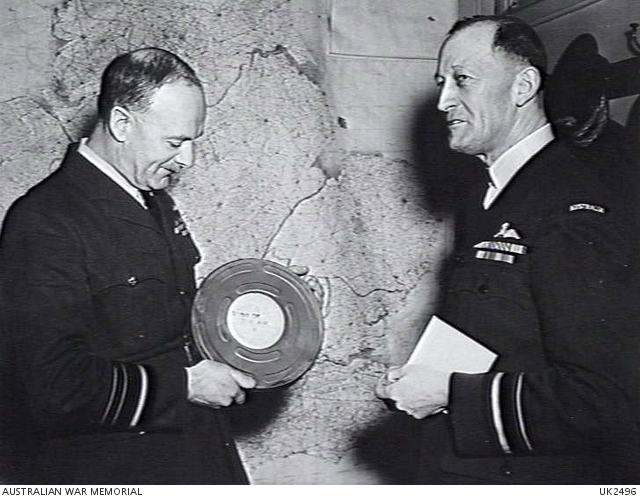
- Leslie Gossage in London, 1945
- Born: 3 February 1891; Liverpool, England
- Died: 8 July 1949 (aged 58); Sussex, England
- Military career
- Allegiance: United Kingdom
- Branch: British Army (1912–18); Royal Air Force (1918–44)
- Service years: 1912–44
- Rank: Air Marshal
- Commands: Balloon Command (1940–44); Air Member for Personnel (1940); Inspector-General of the RAF (1940); No. 11 Group (1936–40); British Forces Aden (1935–36); School of Army Co-operation (1921–23); 1st Wing RFC (1917–19); No. 8 Squadron RFC (1916–17); No. 56 Squadron RFC (1916)
- Conflicts: First World War; Second World War
- Awards: Knight Commander of the Order of the Bath; Commander of the Royal Victorian Order; Distinguished Service Order; Military Cross; Mentioned in Despatches (5); Officer of the Legion of Honour (France)

Air Marshal Sir Ernest Leslie Gossage, KCB, CVO, DSO, MC (3 February 1891 – 8 July 1949) was an officer of the British Army and then of the Royal Air Force. He served as Air Officer Commanding-in-Chief at RAF Balloon Command from 1940 to 1944.

== Early life ==
Gossage was educated at Rugby School and Trinity College, Cambridge. Whilst at Trinity, he joined the Cambridge University Contingent of the Officers Training Corps (OTC), serving in the Artillery section.

== British Army ==
=== Pre-War ===
In 1910, Gossage was commissioned into the Royal Field Artillery while still a first-year student, a considerable accolade. He was commissioned as an officer of the Special Reserve (SR) to ensure he would not be mobilised into service until he had completed his studies and his commission was confirmed in 1911. On graduating in 1912, he was transferred from the Reserve into regular service and began his professional career.

=== First World War ===
When the First World War broke out in 1914 Gossage was still a young second lieutenant in the Royal Field Artillery, where he remained for the first year of the war. However, on 12 May 1915, he was seconded to the Royal Flying Corps where he was assigned to No. 6 Squadron as a pilot. By 5 September 1915 he had reached the rank of captain and had become a Flight Commander in No. 6 Squadron. He was awarded the Military Cross in March the following year for his "consistent good and zealous work under bad weather conditions, both on patrol and when co-operating with the artillery in operations resulting in the capture of the enemy's position".

Following a promotion to major in 1916, Gossage was given command of No. 56 Squadron, later taking command of No. 8 Squadron in the same year. In 1917 Gossage was promoted to lieutenant colonel and took command of the Royal Flying Corps' 1st Wing.

On 1 April 1918, the Royal Air Force was founded and Gossage was transferred to the new Service. He was appointed as a Staff officer in the Directorate of Operations and Intelligence. In 1919, he was awarded the Distinguished Service Order for his period in command. In addition, he was mentioned in despatches for gallantry four times during the war.

== Royal Air Force ==
=== Inter-War ===
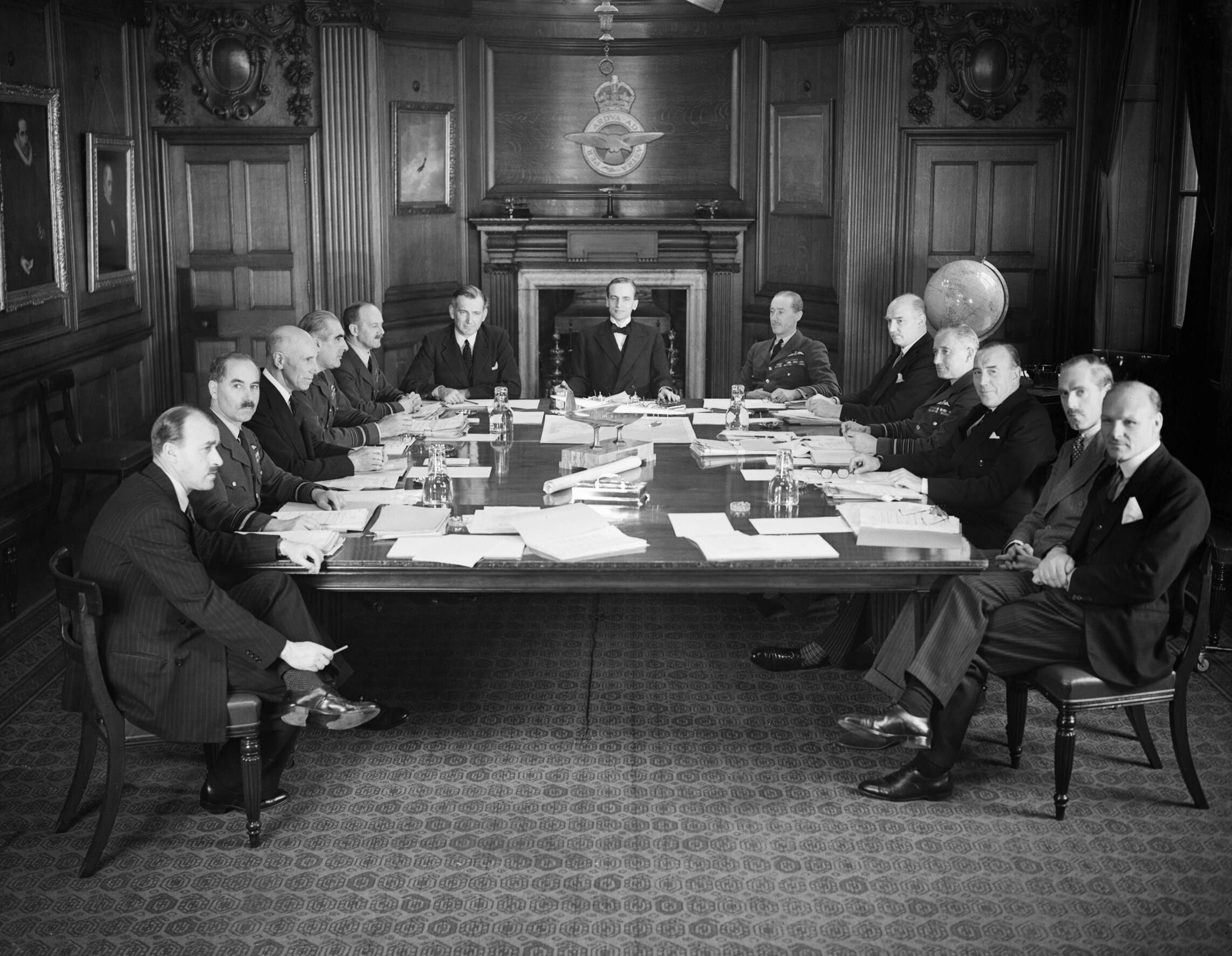
Air Marshal Gossage, fourth from left, as Air Member for Personnel, in session with the Air Council during the Second World War

At the end of the war, Gossage was given a permanent commission in the Royal Air Force. He became Officer Commanding of the School of Army Co-operation before moving on to be deputy director of Staff Duties, in the rank of Group Captain, at the Air Ministry in 1928. He was then appointed Air Attaché in Berlin in 1930, Senior Air Staff Officer (SASO) at Headquarters Air Defence of Great Britain and, in 1934, Senior Air Staff Officer at Headquarters RAF Iraq Command. Gossage was promoted Air Commodore in 1932.

In 1935 he was briefly appointed Air Officer Commanding (AOC) British Forces Aden, before returning home to become Air Officer Commanding No. 11 Group in the new Fighter Command, in 1936. On 1 January 1936, Gossage had been promoted to the rank of Air Vice-Marshal (AVM) and in 1937, AVM Gossage received the CB.

=== Second World War ===
During the Second World War, Gossage served briefly as the Inspector-General of the RAF, then the Air Member for Personnel, before becoming the longest-serving Air Officer Commanding-in-Chief (AOCINC) at RAF Balloon Command, from December 1940 to February 1944. He received a mention in despatches in 1940. In the New Year Honours of January 1941, Air Marshal Gossage was advanced in the Order of the Bath, to receive his knighthood, as Sir Leslie Gossage, KCB. His temporary wartime promotion to Air Marshal was confirmed and substantiated in 1943.

=== Post-War ===
Following his retirement from regular service with the Royal Air Force, Gossage agreed to be re-employed to assume the role of Commandant Air Cadets, following the retirement of Air Commodore John Adrian Chamier; he also agreed to serve temporarily as an Air Vice-Marshal for the duration. He served in this role until he stepped down in 1946.

== Family ==
Air Marshal Sir Leslie Gossage retired to Buxted in Sussex, but died only a few years later, in 1949. He was 58.

Ernest Leslie Gossage was married with two sons. Capt. Gossage married Eileen O'Brien in 1917. Eileen was from a very military and very distinguished family: the daughter of Brigadier-General Edmund O'Brien, late 14th Hussars.

Their elder son, Terence Leslie Gossage was born in 1918. Terence joined the King's Own Yorkshire light Infantry (KOYLI) and retired as a Major, with an MBE. He died in 1999.

The younger son, Peter Leslie Gossage, joined the Royal Air Force Volunteer Reserve (RAFVR) and became a pilot, like his father. He was commissioned as a Pilot Officer and flew Hurricanes with 85 Sqn. Initially based in France as part of the Air Component of the BEF, the squadron was withdrawn during the Battle of France and then operated from Debden. Pilot Officer Peter Gossage was killed on 31 May 1940 and is buried near his family, in Buxted.

== Notes ==
Military offices
Preceded by Charles Portal	Commander, Aden Command; 1935–1936	Succeeded by Wilfred McClaughry
Preceded by Philip Joubert de la Ferté	Air Officer Commanding No. 11 Group; 1936–1940	Succeeded by William Welsh
Preceded by Sir Charles Burnett	Inspector-General of the RAF; 1940	Succeeded by Sir Edgar Ludlow-Hewitt
Preceded by Charles Portal	Air Member for Personnel; 1940	Succeeded by Sir Philip Babington
Preceded by Owen Tudor Boyd	Commander-in-Chief Balloon Command; 1940–1944	Succeeded by William Gell
Preceded by John Adrian Chamier	Commandant Air Training Corps; 1944–1946	Succeeded by 1946–1960 appointments held by Air Officer Commanding-in-Chief Reserve / Home / Flying Training Command.
