= Reginald Portal =

Royal Navy Admiral (1894–1983)

Admiral Sir Reginald Portal KCB DSC
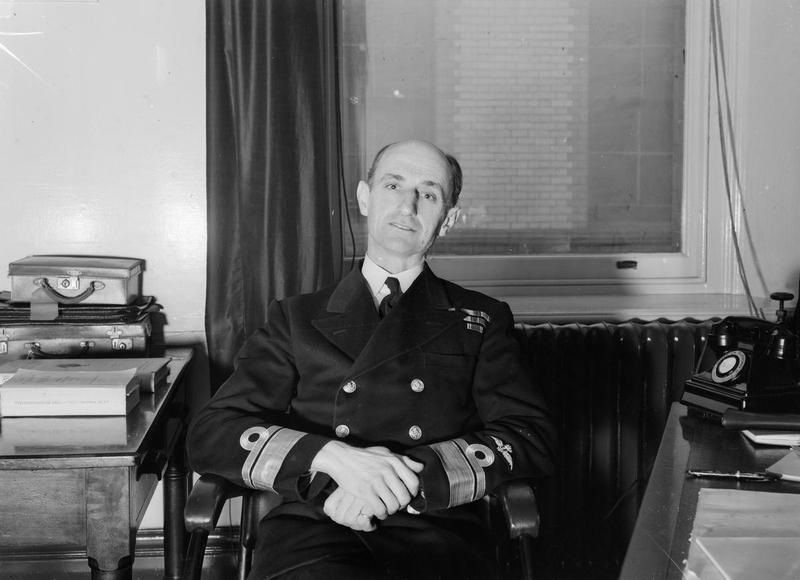
- Portal in 1943
- Born: 6 September 1894; Hungerford, Berkshire
- Died: 18 June 1983 (aged 88)
- Spouse: Helen Anderson
- Children: 4
- Relatives: Charles Portal, 1st Viscount Portal of Hungerford (brother)
- Military career
- Allegiance: United Kingdom
- Branch: Royal Navy
- Service years: 1907–1951
- Rank: Admiral
- Unit: Fleet Air Arm
- Commands: HMS York; HMS Royal Sovereign; Assistant Chief of the Naval Staff (Air); Flag Officer, Naval Air Stations (Australia); Flag Officer, Air (Home)
- Conflicts: First World War; Gallipoli campaign (WIA); Second World War; Raid on Souda Bay; Battle of Crete
- Awards: Knight Commander of the Order of the Bath; Distinguished Service Cross

Admiral Sir Reginald Henry Portal, KCB, DSC (6 September 1894 – 18 June 1983) was a Royal Navy officer and naval aviation pioneer who served in both world wars.

== Early life and family ==
Born near Hungerford, Berkshire, Reginald Portal was the second son of Edward Robert Portal, a country gentleman. His elder brother was Charles Frederick Algernon Portal, later Marshal of the Royal Air Force the Viscount Portal of Hungerford. The family was Huguenot in origin and Reginald Portal was related to the goldsmith and dramatist Abraham Portal, and more distantly so to Wyndham Portal, 1st Viscount Portal.

== Naval career ==
Portal joined the Royal Navy in 1907 and served in the battleship HMS Neptune before the First World War. As an air observer, he received the Distinguished Service Cross during the war for conspicuous bravery in combat over the Dardanelles, when he was wounded. He was assigned to the seaplane carrier HMS Ark Royal as an observer, before returning to general service on the battleship HMS Colossus.
