= RAF Stanmore Park =

Former RAF station in Middlesex, England

RAF Stanmore Park
- Located within Stanmore, Middlesex in England
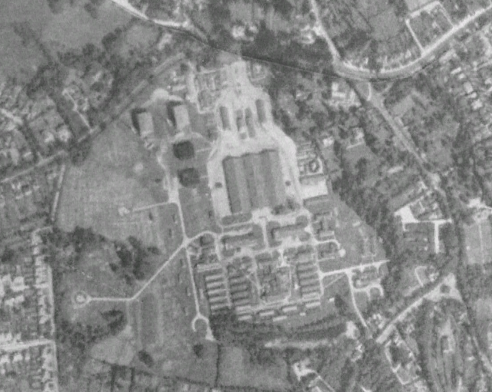
- RAF Stanmore Park in 1945

Site information
- Type: Disestablished Military Administration Headquarters (Non Flying)
- Owner: Air Ministry
- Operator: Royal Air Force
- Controlled by: RAF Fighter Command; RAF Balloon Command
- Condition: Now converted to private housing. One former RAF building is retained by No. 2236 (Air Cadets) Squadron

Location
- Coordinates: 51.614167°N 0.3175°W

Site history
- Built: 1938
- In use: 1939–1997
- Battles/wars: Battle of Britain July – October 1940; Air Offensive, Europe 1942–1945; Cold War 1946–1991

Garrison information
- Garrison: No. 11 Group RAF

Royal Air Force Stanmore Park or more simply RAF Stanmore Park is a former Royal Air Force station in Stanmore, Middlesex (now the London Borough of Harrow). It was opened in 1939 and closed in 1997.

== History ==
The station was opened in 1939 and closed in 1997. In 1939 RAF Balloon Command was established at Stanmore Park. Stanmore Hall was purchased by the Air Ministry in 1938. Buildings were built on the grounds of Stanmore Hall, and the hall was demolished during the station development programme.

RAF Stanmore Park formed part of No 11 Group, which was originally at RAF Uxbridge and then transferred to nearby RAF Bentley Priory until its closure. The station closed in April 1997, with housing built on much of the site. One building was retained for the use of 2236 Air Training Corps The building currently in use is the converted / extended NAAFI building which was between the Married Quarters and Junior Ranks Mess. The Community Centre now houses Army Youth Services, Nursery School, a Mums and Tots group and 2236 ATC Sqn. A number of activities now take place at the centre when not in use by these organisations.

== See also ==
- List of former Royal Air Force stations
