= Owen Tudor Boyd =

Royal Air Force air marshal (1889–1944)

Air Marshal Owen Tudor Boyd CB OBE MC AFC
- Boyd in 1940
- Born: 30 August 1889; London, England
- Died: 5 August 1944 (aged 54); London, England
- Military career
- Allegiance: United Kingdom; British India
- Branch: British Army (1909–18); Royal Air Force (1918–44); British Indian Army
- Service years: 1909–1944
- Rank: Air marshal
- Unit: Royal Flying Corps
- Commands: No. 93 Group (1944); RAF Balloon Command (1938–40); No. 1 Group (1935–36); RAF Aden (1931–34); School of Army Co-operation (1923–25); No. 24 Squadron (1922–23); No. 72 Squadron (1918); No. 66 Squadron (1917)
- Conflicts: First World War; Second World War
- Awards: Companion of the Order of the Bath; Officer of the Order of the British Empire; Military Cross; Air Force Cross; Mentioned in Despatches (2)

Air Marshal Owen Tudor Boyd, CB, OBE, MC, AFC (30 August 1889 – 5 August 1944) was a British aviator and military officer. He served with the Royal Flying Corps during the First World War before transferring to the newly formed Royal Air Force in 1918, with which he served during the interwar period and into the Second World War.

== Education and pre-war career ==
Born in Marylebone, Boyd was educated at the Royal Military College, Sandhurst. On 20 January 1909, he was commissioned on the 'unattached list for the Indian Army' and attached to a British Army regiment in India before being appointed to the Indian Army in March 1910. Boyd was posted to the Indian Army's 5th Cavalry. He was promoted Lieutenant on 20 April 1911.

== First World War ==
Boyd was promoted temporary Captain, Indian Army, to date from the 1 September 1915 in the London Gazette of 28 July 1916. From 25 April 1916, he saw service in the First World War as a flying officer with the Royal Flying Corps. Later in 1916, he was a pilot on the Western Front with No. 27 Squadron; on 9 July, he was promoted to flight commander. He was awarded the Military Cross in the London Gazette of 18 August 1916.

Boyd stayed on the Western Front and continued to earn promotion. On 26 October, he was made officer commanding of a squadron and on 19 January 1917, took command of No. 66 Squadron.

In June 1917, he was moved to a staff appointment and on 2 December, he was made a staff officer, 2nd Class, RFC (captain – graded as brigade major).

By 7 July 1918, Boyd was in Mesopotamia as officer commanding No. 72 Squadron.

== Inter-war years ==
From 18 January 1919, Boyd was an officer commanding and a staff officer (acting lieutenant colonel). On 1 August, he was awarded a permanent commission as a major. By 21 January 1920, he was a staff officer with the Mesopotamian Wing Headquarters. He was also involved as a staff officer with the Directorate of Operations and Intelligence.

On 23 October 1922, Boyd was once again commanding a squadron, this time No. 24 Squadron.

On 26 February 1923, he was made the Commandant of the School of Army Co-operation. Starting 21 January 1926, he attended the Army Staff College, Camberley. By 21 January 1928, he was on the directing staff of the college.

On 4 January 1930, Boyd became the deputy director of staff duties.

On 7 August 1931, Boyd was the officer commanding, RAF Aden. By 16 April 1934, he was Secretary of State for Air for the Headquarters Fighting Area. By 24 October 1935, he was air officer commanding, Central Area.

On 1 May 1936, Boyd was promoted to air commodore of No. 1 Group RAF. He was appointed director of personal services at the Air Ministry in December 1936.

== Second World War ==
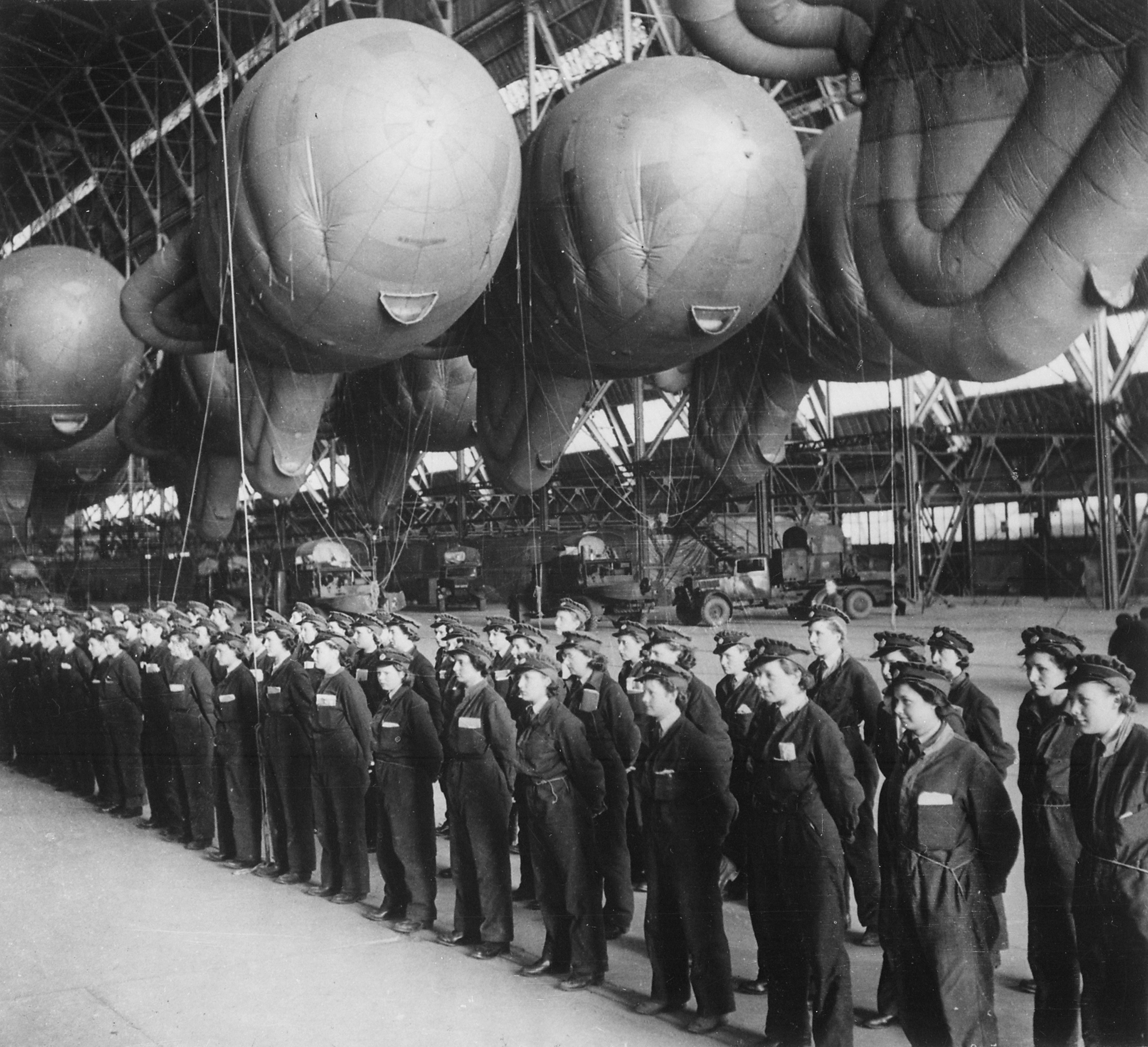
Women's Auxiliary Air Force barrage balloon crews at RAF Cardington.

In 1938, as an air vice marshal, Boyd became commander-in-chief RAF Balloon Command. On 1 December 1940, he was replaced by Air Marshal Sir Leslie Gossage at RAF Balloon Command. Boyd was then promoted to air marshal and appointed deputy to the air officer commanding-in-chief (AOC-in-C) Middle East.

On his way to Egypt, Boyd was to stop in Malta. However, the aircraft in which he and his staff were passengers was forced down over enemy-controlled Sicily by a group of Italian fighter aircraft. There was some concern over his capture as Boyd had had access to "Ultra" intelligence and was aware of the advantage being gained from the breaking of some German codes. This led to fears he could reveal these secrets. One history book refers to "the reported circumstance is a navigation error and consequent fuel shortage" in the flight that led to Boyd's capture.

After destroying his confidential papers by setting his own aircraft on fire, Boyd became a prisoner of war (POW). He spent much of the war in the Castle Vincigliata (Castello di Vincigliata) camp near Florence, Italy.

When Italy capitulated in September 1943, Boyd and two British Army generals (Philip Neame and Richard O'Connor, both captured in North Africa in 1941), escaped with help from the Italian resistance movement while being transferred from Vincigliata. After spending time in the Italian countryside and a failed rendezvous with a submarine, they arrived by boat at Termoli, then went on to Bari where they were welcomed as guests by General Sir Harold Alexander, commanding the Allied Armies fighting on the Italian Front, on 21 December 1943. Their escape was led by a Lieutenant Colonel Pat Spooner, who had escaped once before and returned to German-controlled Italy.

Of all of RAF Bomber Command's wartime group commanders, Boyd spent the shortest time in command of his appointed group. In late July 1944, he was divorced. Little more than a week later, on 5 August, he was dead from a heart attack.

Military offices
Preceded by Cuthbert MacLean; As Air Officer Commanding Aden Command	Officer Commanding RAF Aden; 1931–1934	Succeeded by Charles Portal; As Officer Commanding Aden Command
Preceded by Hazelton Nicholl	Air Officer Commanding Central Area; 1935–1936	Formation renamed as No. 1 Group
Preceded by J C Quinnell; Quinnel's command was redesignated No. 6 Group in 1936	Air Officer Commanding No. 1 Group; 1936	Succeeded by S W Smith
New title Command established	Air Officer Commanding Balloon Command; 1938–1940	Succeeded by Sir Leslie Gossage
Preceded by Alan Ritchie	Air Officer Commanding No. 93 Group; 1944	Succeeded by George Hodson
