= Charles Portal, 1st Viscount Portal of Hungerford =

Marshal of the Royal Air Force (1893–1971)

The Right Honourable The Viscount Portal of Hungerford KG GCB OM DSO & Bar MC DL
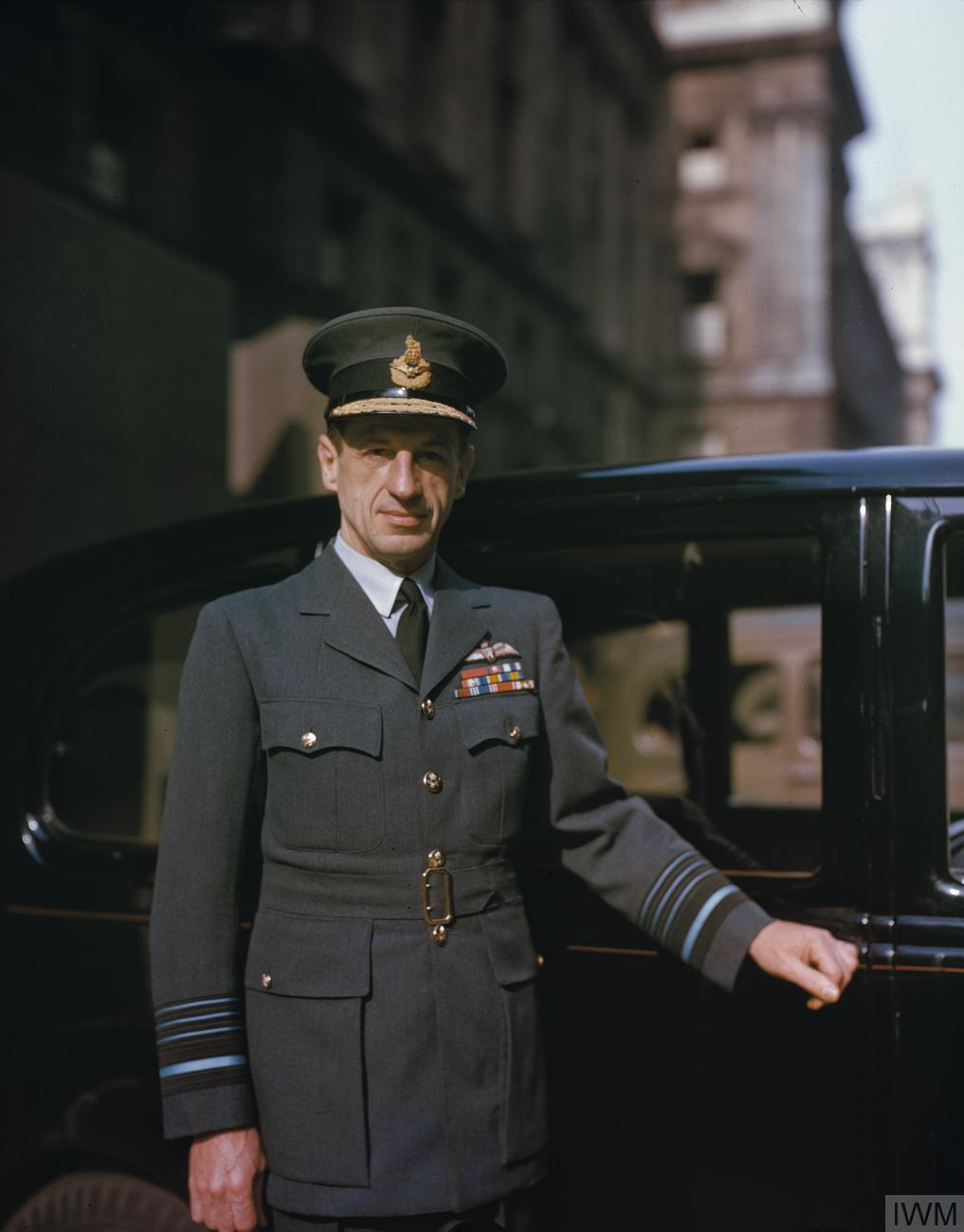
- Air Chief Marshal Portal standing by a staff car outside Air Ministry buildings in London, during the Second World War
- Born: 21 May 1893; Hungerford, Berkshire, England
- Died: 22 April 1971 (aged 77); West Ashling, West Sussex, England
- Spouse: Joan Margaret Welby (m. 1919)
- Relatives: Rosemary Portal, 2nd Baroness Portal of Hungerford (daughter)
- Military career
- Allegiance: United Kingdom
- Branch: British Army (1914–18); Royal Air Force (1918–45)
- Service years: 1914–1945
- Rank: Marshal of the Royal Air Force
- Nickname: Peter
- Commands: Chief of the Air Staff (1940–46); Bomber Command (1940); Air Member for Personnel (1939–40); Aden Command (1934–35); No. 7 Squadron (1927–28); No. 1 Wing (1919); No. 16 Squadron (1917–18)
- Conflicts: First World War; Second World War
- Awards: Knight Companion of the Order of the Garter; Knight Grand Cross of the Order of the Bath; Member of the Order of Merit; Companion of the Distinguished Service Order & Bar; Military Cross; Mentioned in Despatches (3)

Marshal of the Royal Air Force Charles Frederick Algernon Portal, 1st Viscount Portal of Hungerford, KG, GCB, OM, DSO & Bar, MC, DL (21 May 1893 – 22 April 1971) was a senior Royal Air Force officer. He served as a bomber pilot in the First World War, and rose to become first a flight commander and then a squadron commander, flying light bombers on the Western Front.

In the early stages of the Second World War he was commander-in-chief of Bomber Command. He was an advocate of strategic area bombing against German industrial areas, and viewed it as a war winning strategy. In October 1940 he was made Chief of the Air Staff, and remained in this post for the rest of the war. During his time as Chief he continuously supported the strategic bombing offensive against Germany, and advocated the formation of the Pathfinder Force, critical to improving the destructive force of Bomber Command. He fended off attempts by the Royal Navy to take command over RAF Coastal Command, and resisted attempts by the British Army to establish their own Army Air Arm. Portal retired from the RAF following the end of the war. He served as Controller of Production (Atomic Energy) at the Ministry of Supply for six years. Portal was then made chairman of British Aluminium. He was unsuccessful in fending off a hostile takeover of British Aluminum by Sir Ivan Stedeford's Tube Investments, in what was known as the "Aluminium War". Afterward he served as chairman of the British Aircraft Corporation.

== Early life ==
Portal was born at Eddington House, Hungerford, Berkshire, the son of Edward Robert Portal and his wife Ellinor Kate (née Hill). His younger brother Admiral Sir Reginald Portal (1894–1983) joined the Royal Navy and also had a distinguished career. The Portals had Huguenot origins, having arrived in England in the 17th century. He was related to the goldsmith and dramatist Abraham Portal, and more distantly so to Wyndham Portal, 1st Viscount Portal.

Charles Portal, or "Peter" as he was nicknamed, was educated at Winchester College and Christ Church, Oxford. Portal had intended to become a barrister but he did not finish his degree and he left undergraduate life to enlist as a private soldier in 1914.

== First World War ==
At the beginning of the First World War, Portal joined the British Army and served as a dispatch rider in the motorcycle section of the Royal Engineers on the Western Front. Portal was made a corporal very soon after joining the Army and he was commissioned as a second lieutenant only weeks later. Around the same time, Portal was commended in Sir John French's first despatch of September 1914. In December 1914, Portal was given command of all riders in the 1st Corps Headquarters Signals Company.

In July 1915, with the need for dispatch riders decreasing, Portal transferred to the Royal Flying Corps (RFC). He served first as an observer and then, from November 1915, as a flying officer. He graduated as a pilot in April 1916, and joined No. 60 Squadron flying Morane monoplanes on the Western Front. He became a flight commander with No. 3 Squadron flying BE2c aircraft on the Western Front on 16 July 1916. Portal was promoted to temporary major in June 1917 and given command of No. 16 Squadron flying RE8 aircraft on the Western Front at the same time. He was promoted to temporary lieutenant colonel on 17 June 1918 and given command of No. 24 (Training) Wing at RAF Grantham in August 1918. Portal was awarded the Military Cross in January 1917, the citation for which reads:

For conspicuous gallantry in action. He has done excellent artillery work in the air, often in bad weather and at low altitudes; he has always set his flight the best of examples. On one occasion he shot down a hostile machine.

He was also appointed a Companion of the Distinguished Service Order (DSO) on 18 July 1917 and a Bar to his DSO insignia on 18 July 1918. The DSO's citation reads:

For conspicuous gallantry and devotion to duty. For many months he has done magnificent work in co-operation with the artillery. During an attack he succeeded in silencing nine active hostile batteries, ranging our artillery. His splendid example has been of the greatest value.

The bar's citation:

For conspicuous gallantry and devotion to duty. During a period of four months, chiefly under adverse weather conditions, he repeatedly carried out successful raids by day and night, his ingenuity and daring enabling him to drop many tons of bombs on important enemy posts. One night he crossed the lines five times, only landing between each flight to replenish with bombs. Another day he took on single-handed five enemy machines, and drove down three of them—a most gallant and splendid feat. On another day, despite thick mist, he registered one of our batteries on an enemy battery, causing the destruction of one pit and obtaining one fire and two explosions; and another day, flying for 5 1/4 hours, he carried out two very successful counter-battery shoots, observing 350 rounds. He has always set a most magnificent example to the squadron under his command.

== Inter-war career ==
In August 1919 Portal was appointed to a permanent commission in the Royal Air Force in the rank of major (shortly afterwards redesignated as a squadron leader). He became a chief flying instructor at the Royal Air Force College Cranwell in November 1919 and then attended RAF Staff College in 1922, before joining the air staff conducting flying operations in the home sector in April 1923. Promoted to wing commander on 1 July 1925, he attended the senior officers' war course at the Royal Naval College, Greenwich, in 1926 before taking over No. 7 Squadron flying Vickers Virginia bombers in March 1927 and concentrated on improving bombing accuracy.

Portal attended the Imperial Defence College in 1929 and became deputy director of Plans in the Directorate of Operations & Intelligence at the Air Ministry in December 1930. Promoted to group captain on 1 July 1931, he was appointed commander of British forces in Aden in February 1934, in which role he tried to control the local tribesmen by use of an air blockade. Promoted to air commodore on 1 January 1935, he joined the Directing Staff at the Imperial Defence College in January 1936. Portal was promoted to air vice-marshal on 1 July 1937 before being appointed Director of Organization at the Air Ministry on 1 September 1937.

== Second World War ==
Appointed a Companion of the Order of the Bath in the 1939 New Year Honours, Portal became Air Member for Personnel on the Air Council on 1 February 1939. He was promoted to the acting rank of air marshal on 3 September 1939, appointed commander-in-chief of Bomber Command in April 1940 and promoted to the substantive rank of air marshal on 1 July 1940. Portal advocated strategic area bombing against German industrial areas, the same sort of targets that the Luftwaffe was already targeting in the United Kingdom. He was advanced to Knight Commander of the Order of the Bath in the 1940 Birthday Honours.

On 25 October 1940, Portal was appointed as Chief of the Air Staff with the temporary rank of air chief marshal (made permanent in April 1942). He continued in this capacity for the remainder of the war. The first issue he had to resolve was an attempt by the Royal Navy to take over RAF Coastal Command as well as an attempt by the British Army to establish their own Army Air Arm. Portal successfully persuaded both the Army and the Navy that the RAF could adequately look after their needs. The second great task facing Portal was to renew the strategic bombing offensive. In August 1941 he received a report on the relative inefficiency of RAF daytime raids and proposals for area bombing by night: to implement the proposals he determined that a new leader was required and replaced the chief of bomber command, Air Chief Marshal Richard Peirse, with Arthur Harris. He was advanced to Knight Grand Cross of the Order of the Bath in the 1942 Birthday Honours.

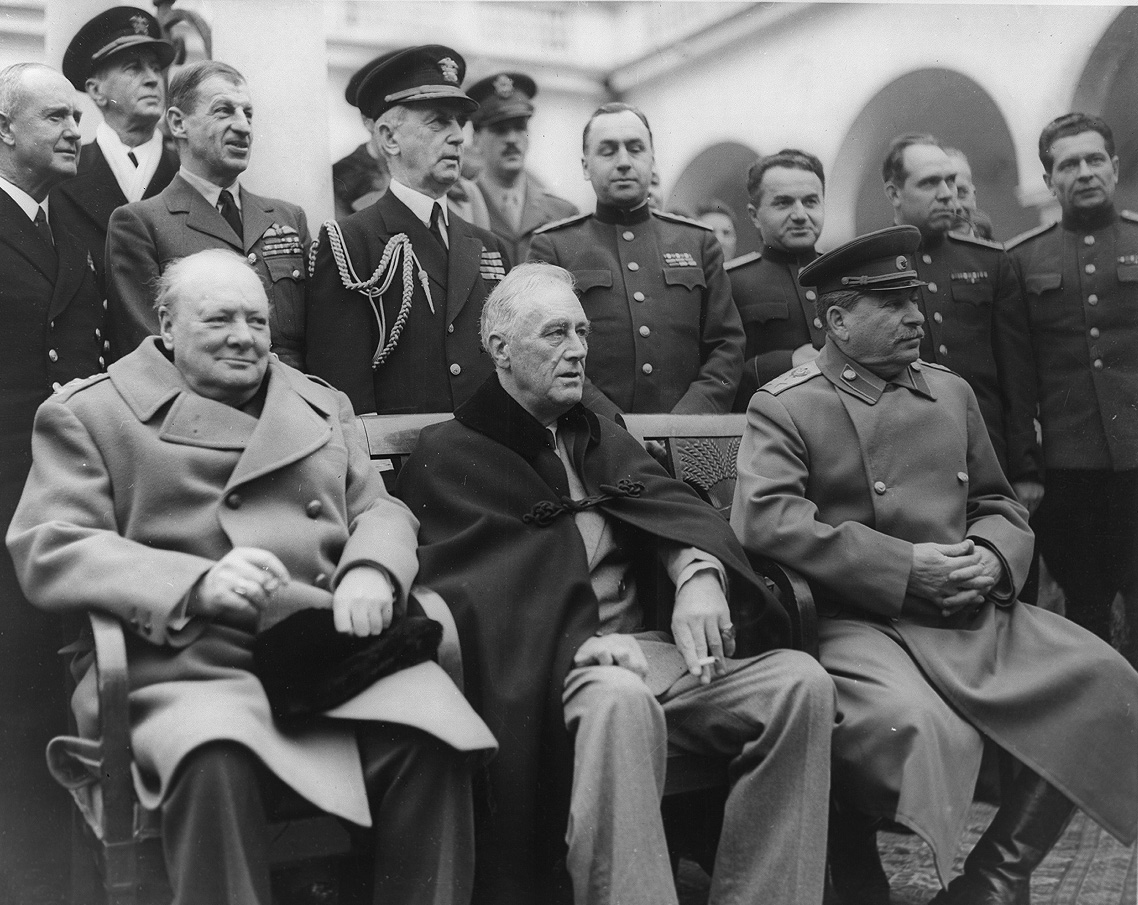
The Yalta Conference. Portal is shown standing behind Churchill.

Portal accompanied Churchill to all the great conferences and made a good impression on Americans. In January 1943, at the Casablanca Conference, the Combined Chiefs of Staff selected him to coordinate the bomber forces of both the United States and Britain in a combined bomber offensive over Germany. The forces were transferred to U.S. General Dwight D. Eisenhower for the duration of Operation Overlord; but when their control reverted to the Combined Chiefs, Portal still advocated area bombing of German cities instead of specific targets, such as Axis oil production facilities. He was promoted to Marshal of the Royal Air Force on 1 January 1944.

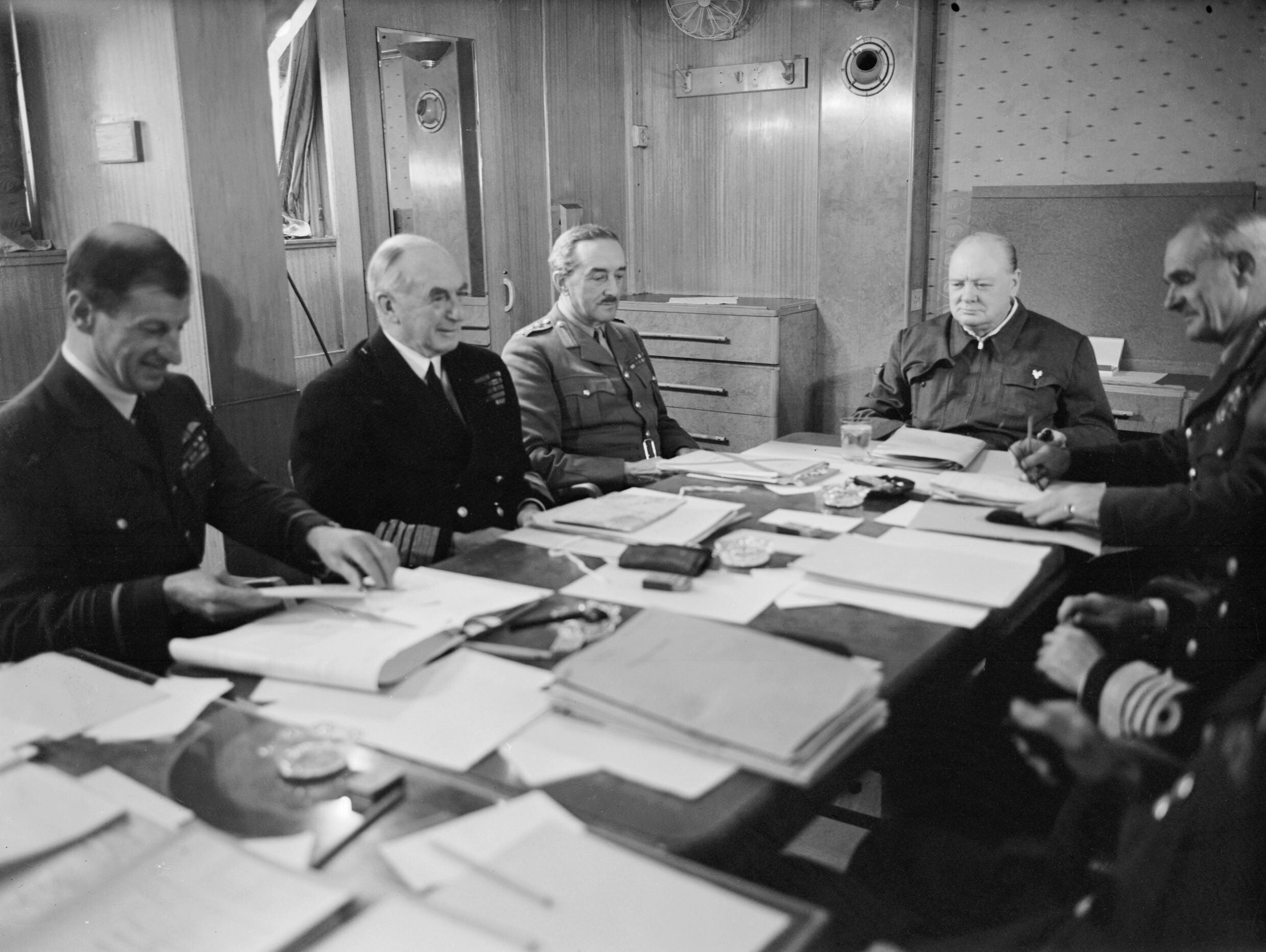
Seated in May 1943 around a conference table aboard the RMS Queen Mary are, left to right: Air Marshal Sir Charles Portal, Admiral of the Fleet Sir Dudley Pound, General Sir Alan Brooke, Mr Winston Churchill. Prime Minister Churchill is presiding over the meeting at the end of the table.

In early 1944, Portal's view of strategic bombing changed; he felt that bombers could also play a more auxiliary role in the allied offensive. (Much of what is known about Portal's thinking is based on memoranda he wrote.) He argued for the new approach on the basis of the huge increase in the size of the bomber force, which would carry out not just precision bombing but also indiscriminate area bombing by night of all German cities with populations exceeding 100,000. Portal thought that the resulting damage to the German war effort and civilian morale would lead to victory within six months. A second memorandum in 1945 made a similar argument.

In March 1945, Churchill gave the final order to stop Portal's strategy of area bombing, after the firestorm of Dresden a few weeks earlier. Churchill subsequently distanced himself from the bombing writing that "the destruction of Dresden remains a serious query against the conduct of Allied Bombing".

== Post-war activities ==
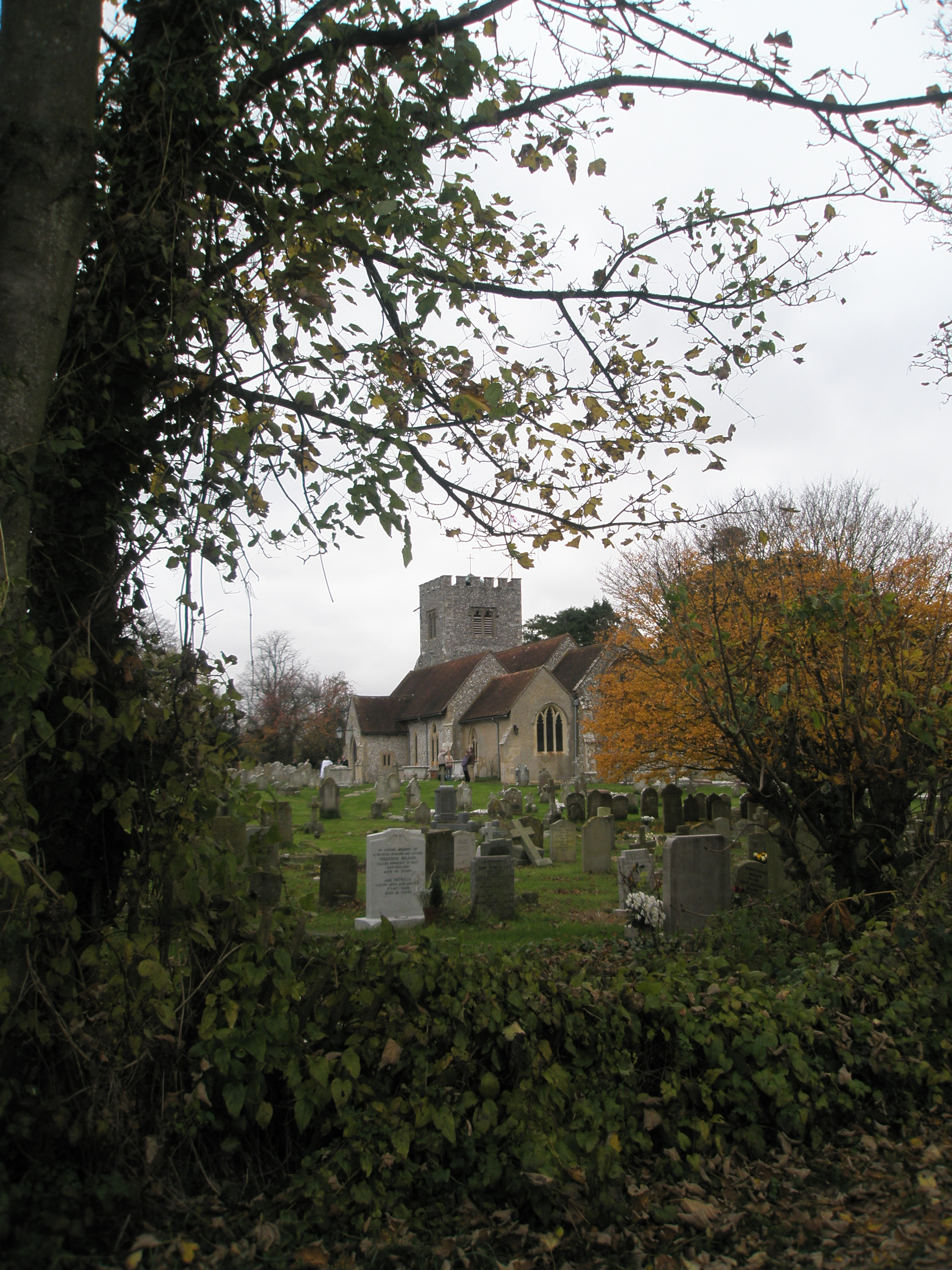
St. Mary's parish church and cemetery, in Funtington, West Sussex, where Lord Portal of Hungerford's ashes are buried.

In 1945, after the war's end, Portal retired from the RAF and on 12 October 1945 he was raised to the peerage as Baron Portal of Hungerford in the County of Berkshire, with remainder, failing male issue of his own, to his daughters and their male heirs. On 8 February 1946 he was further honoured when he was made Viscount Portal of Hungerford, in the County of Berkshire, with normal remainder to his heirs male. He was made a Member of the Order of Merit on 1 January 1946. He was also awarded the American Distinguished Service Medal on 15 March 1946 and appointed a Knight Grand Cross of the Dutch Order of Orange-Nassau on 18 November 1947. He was also appointed a Knight Grand Cross of the Belgian Order of the Crown with Palm and awarded the Belgian Croix de Guerre, 1940, with Palm on 27 August 1948.

From 1946 to 1951, Portal was Controller of Production (Atomic Energy) at the Ministry of Supply. Christopher Hinton, responsible for the production of fissile material, said later, "I cannot remember that he ever did anything that helped us." He attended the funeral of King George VI in February 1952 and the coronation of Queen Elizabeth II in June 1953.

Portal was elected Chairman of British Aluminium and in 1958/1959 he fought in the City of London's "Aluminium War" against a hostile takeover bid by Sir Ivan Stedeford, chairman and chief executive of Tube Investments. T.I. along with its ally Reynolds Metals of the US, won the takeover battle, and in the process, rewrote the way the City conducted its business in relation to shareholders and investors. Stedeford replaced Portal as Chairman of British Aluminium. In 1960 Portal was elected chairman of the British Aircraft Corporation. Portal died from cancer at his home at West Ashling near Chichester on 22 April 1971. His ashes are buried near his home in Funtington churchyard. In 1975 a statue commemorating Portal was unveiled by Prime Minister Harold Macmillan in the gardens outside the Ministry of Defence Main Building.

== Family ==
In July 1919, Portal married Joan Margaret Welby (1898–1996); they had a son (who died at birth) and two daughters. The viscountcy died with him but he was succeeded in the barony according to the special remainder by his elder daughter, Rosemary Ann, who died in 1990.

== Arms ==
Coat of arms of Charles Portal, 1st Viscount Portal of Hungerford
Crest Issuant from an astral crown Or a portal between two towers Proper. Escutcheon Argent a lion rampant Sable between a fleur-de-lys Azure and a rose Gules barbed and seeded Proper on a chief of the third an astral crown Or. Supporters Dexter a pilot of the Royal Air Force, sinister a mechanic of the Royal Air Force, both in service dress Proper. Motto Armet Nos Ultio Regum

Military offices
Preceded by Owen Boyd	Officer Commanding Aden Command; Air Officer Commanding from 1 January 1935; 1934–1935	Succeeded by Leslie Gossage
Preceded by William Welsh	Director of Organisation; 1937–1939	Succeeded by Grahame Donald
Preceded by Sir William Mitchell	Air Member for Personnel; 1939–1940	Succeeded by Sir Leslie Gossage
Preceded by Sir Edgar Ludlow-Hewitt	Commander-in-Chief Bomber Command; 1940	Succeeded by Sir Richard Peirse
Preceded by Sir Cyril Newall	Chief of the Air Staff; 1940–1946	Succeeded by Sir Arthur Tedder
Government offices
New office	Controller of Production (Atomic Energy); Controller Atomic Energy from 1950; 1946–1951	Succeeded by Sir Frederick Morgan
Business positions
Unknown	Chairman of British Aluminium; 1953–1958	Succeeded by Sir Ivan Stedeford
New title Corporation formed	Chairman of the British Aircraft Corporation; 1960–1963	Succeeded by Sir George Edwards
Peerage of the United Kingdom
New creation	Viscount Portal of Hungerford; 1946–1971	Extinct
New creation	Baron Portal of Hungerford; 1945–1971	Succeeded by Rosemary Ann Portal
