= RAF Balloon Command =

Former command of the Royal Air Force

Balloon Command
- Balloon Command badge
- Active: 1 November 1938–February 1945
- Country: United Kingdom
- Branch: Royal Air Force
- Mottos: Vi Et Ictu (Latin: By Force and Impact).
- Engagements: World War II

Balloon Command was the Royal Air Force command which was responsible for controlling all the United Kingdom-based barrage balloon units during the Second World War.

== No. 30 (Balloon Barrage) Group, 1937-38 ==
Prior to the establishment of Balloon Command, a balloon group was brought into being in 1937. It was known as No. 30 (Balloon Barrage) Group and was commanded by Air Commodore John Hearson.

Before the establishment of Balloon Command No. 30 (Balloon) Group administered ten squadrons in four Balloon Centres. The centres included:

No. 1 Balloon Centre at Kidbrooke

- No. 901 (County of London) (Balloon) Squadron Auxiliary Air Force
- No. 902 (County of London) (Balloon) Squadron Auxiliary Air Force
- No. 903 (County of London) (Balloon) Squadron Auxiliary Air Force

No. 2 Balloon Centre at Hook

- No. 904 (County of Surrey) (Balloon) Squadron Auxiliary Air Force
- No. 905 (County of Surrey) (Balloon) Squadron Auxiliary Air Force

No. 3 Balloon Centre at Stanmore

- No. 906 (County of Middlesex) (Balloon) Squadron Auxiliary Air Force
- No. 907 (County of Middlesex) (Balloon) Squadron Auxiliary Air Force

No. 4 Balloon Centre at Chigwell

- No. 908 (County of Essex) (Balloon) Squadron Auxiliary Air Force
- No. 909 (County of Essex) (Balloon) Squadron Auxiliary Air Force
- No. 910 (County of Essex) (Balloon) Squadron Auxiliary Air Force

== Balloon Command ==
Balloon Command was formed on 1 November 1938 at RAF Stanmore Park in Middlesex. It consisted of a headquarters and several groups. All Balloon Squadrons numbered 901 to 947 were formed within the Auxiliary Air Force (AAF) prior to the outbreak of war in September 1939, thereafter, the remainder numbered 948 to 999 were RAF Squadrons.

Balloon Command was disbanded on 5th February 1945.

=== Structure 1939-1945 ===
During World War II, the command had the following organization:

- Headquarters at Old Church Lane, Stanmore in Middlesex, nearby RAF Fighter Command. This in turn directly controlled:
  - RAF Cardington
  - RAF Chessington

The command consisted of five groups which were in turn subdivided into balloon centres (equivalent to wings of heavier-than-air aircraft). The organization was as follows:

- No. 30 Group headquartered at Chessington, near Surbiton, Surrey (1 November 1938 to 7 January 1945)
  - No. 1 Balloon Centre
  - No. 2 Balloon Centre
  - No. 3 Balloon Centre
  - No. 4 Balloon Centre
  - No. 12 Balloon Centre
- No. 31 Group (1 April 1939 to 13 November 1941), Birmingham
- No. 32 Group headquartered at Claverton Manor, Claverton, near Bath, Somerset (1 March 1939 to 15 November 1944)
  - No. 6 Balloon Centre (earlier in 33 Group)
  - No. 11 Balloon Centre
  - No. 13 Balloon Centre
  - No. 14 Balloon Centre
- No. 33 Group headquartered at Parkhead House, Abbey Lane, Sheffield, Yorkshire (1 March 1939 to 4 September 1944)
  - No. 5 Balloon Centre
  - No. 6 Balloon Centre (later in 32 Group)
  - No. 8 Balloon Centre
  - No. 9 Balloon Centre
  - No. 10 Balloon Centre
  - No. 15 Balloon Centre (earlier in 34 Group)
  - No. 16 Balloon Centre
  - No. 17 Balloon Centre
- No. 34 Group headquartered at Tor House, Corstorphine Road, Edinburgh (7 April 1940 to 19 July 1943)
  - No. 15 Balloon Centre (later in 33 Group)
  - No. 18 Balloon Centre

The dates indicated give the periods for which each group existed as part of Balloon Command. No. 30 and 31 groups also existed in World War I as part of different formations.

The balloon centres in turn consisted of balloon squadrons which were numbered from 900 to 994.

== Commanders ==
The following officers were in command:

- 1 November 1938 Air Vice-Marshal Owen Tudor Boyd
- 1 December 1940 Air Marshal Sir Leslie Gossage
- 1 February 1944 Air Vice-Marshal W C C Gell
- 13 February 1945 Air Commodore P L Lincoln
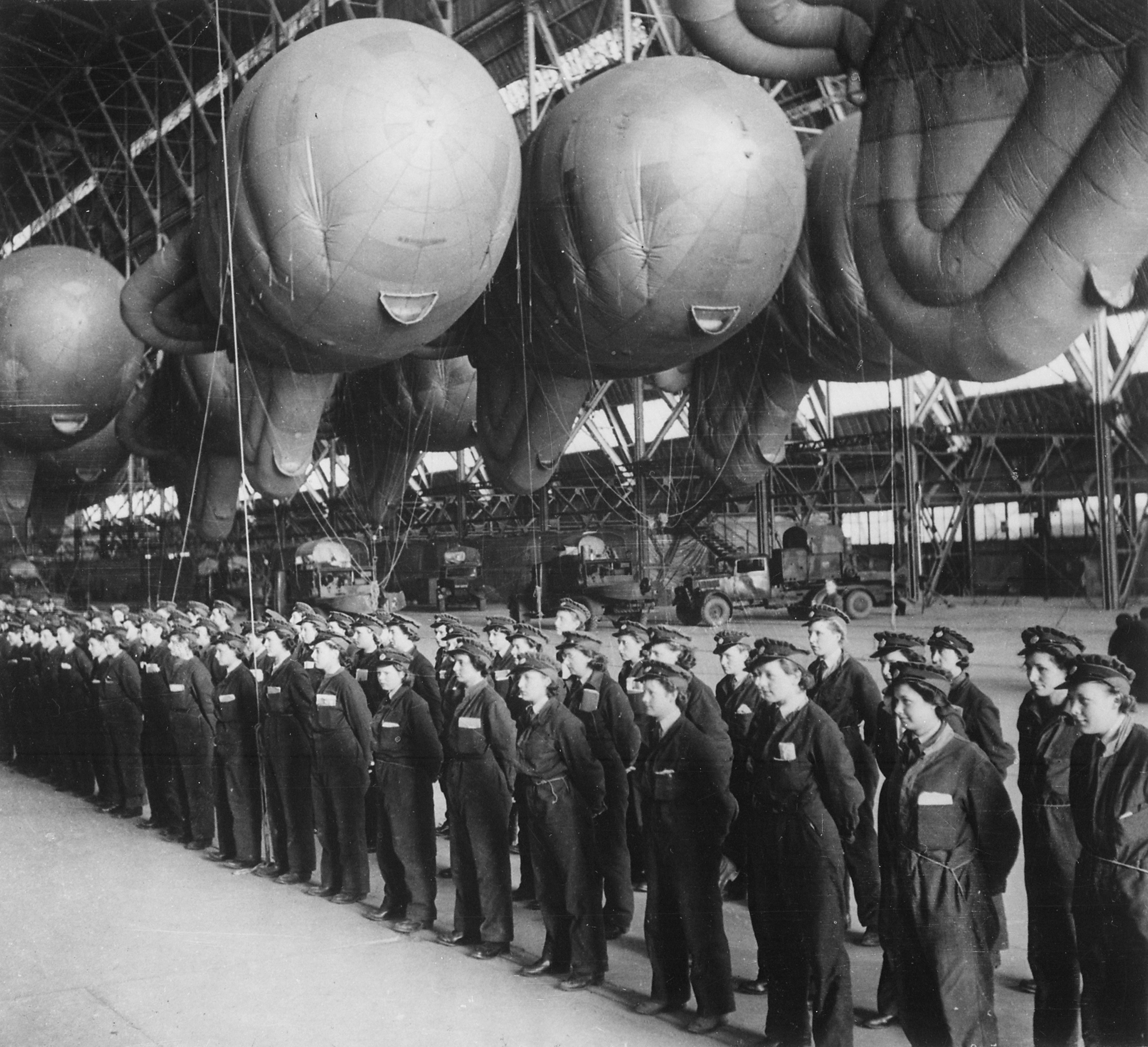
WAAF Barrage Balloon crews at RAF Cardington.

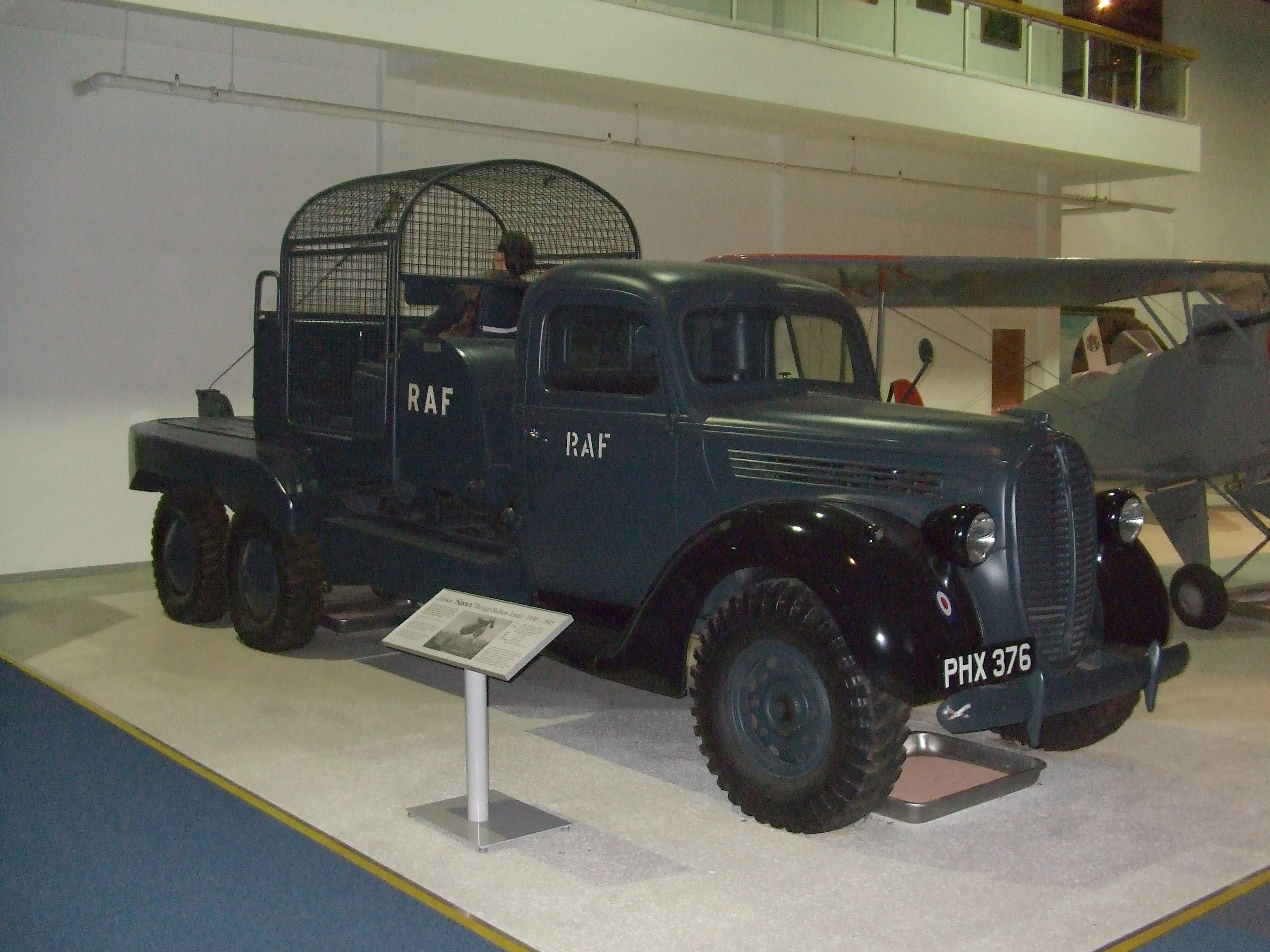
Restored Fordson Sussex Balloon Winch Tender

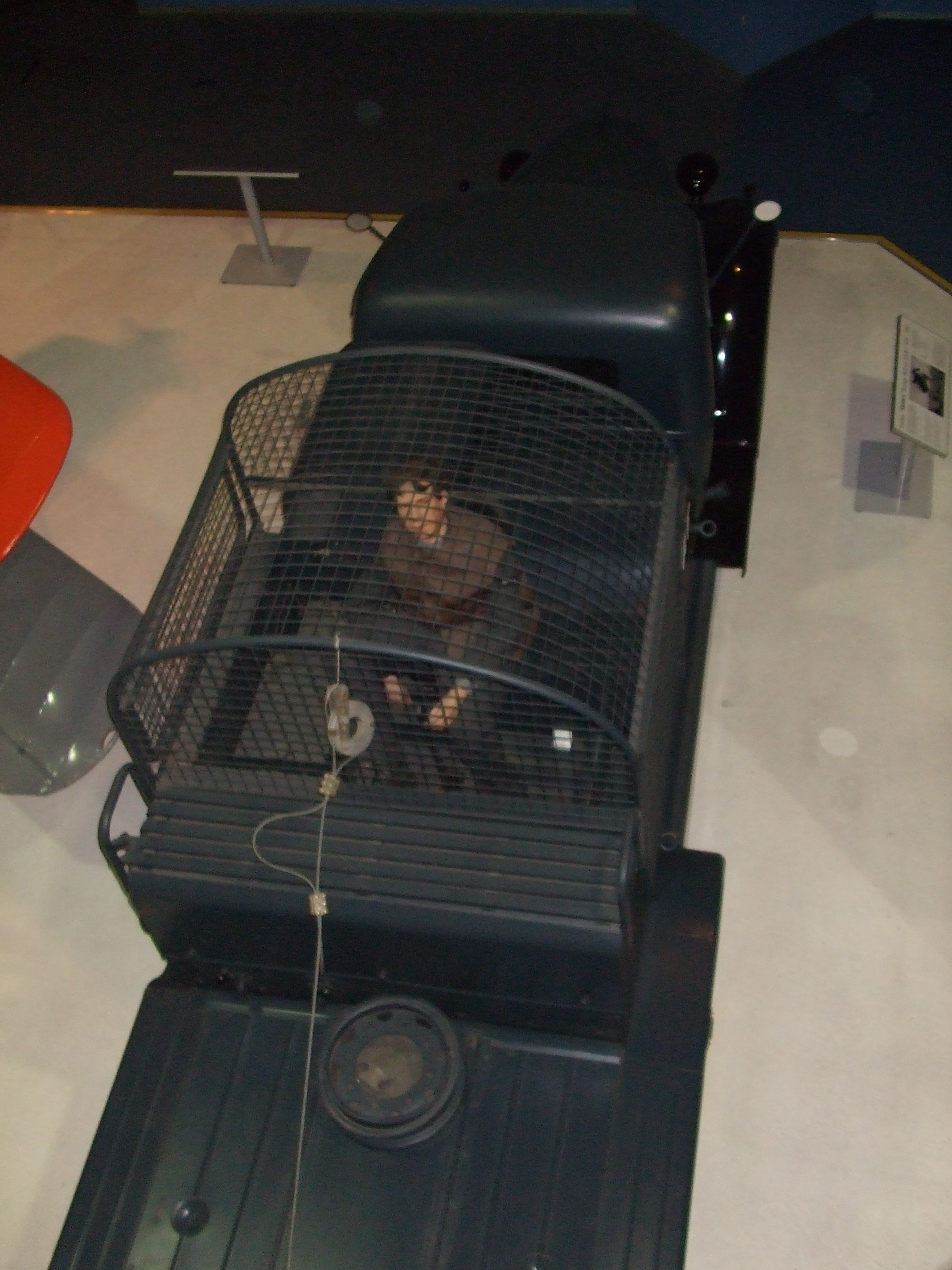
Rear view of Fordson Sussex on display at the RAF Museum Hendon.

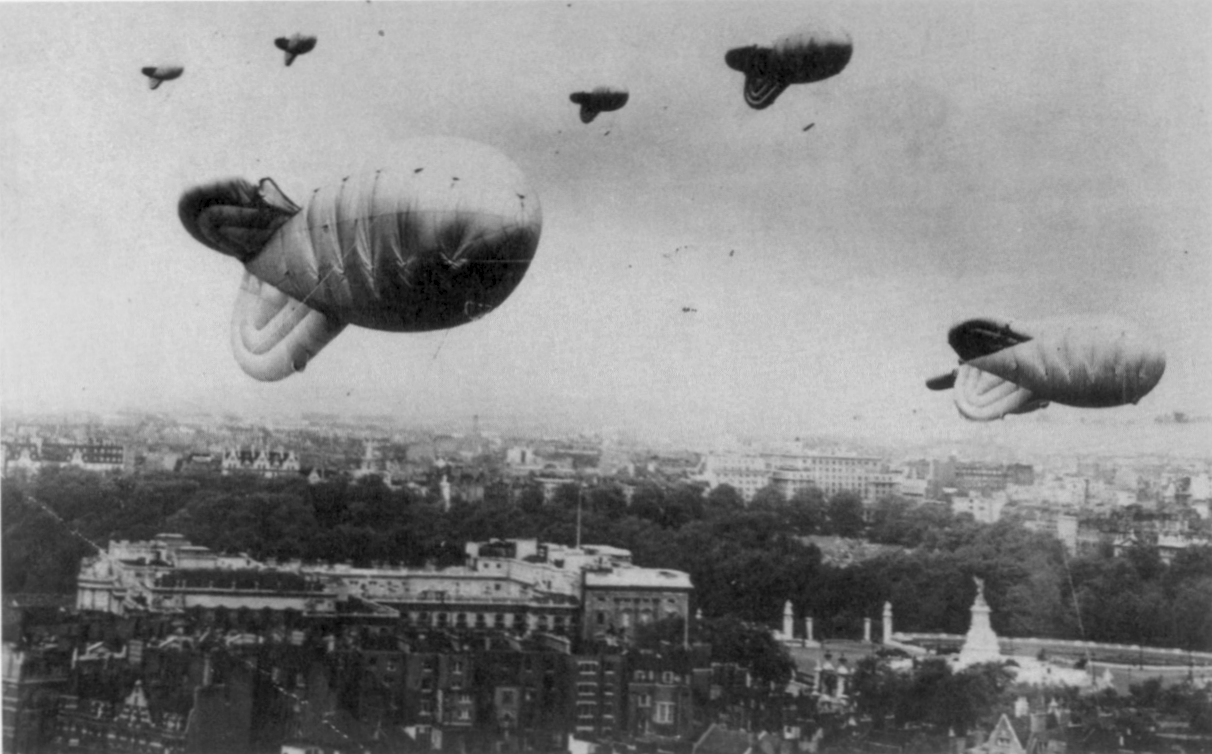
Balloons over London.

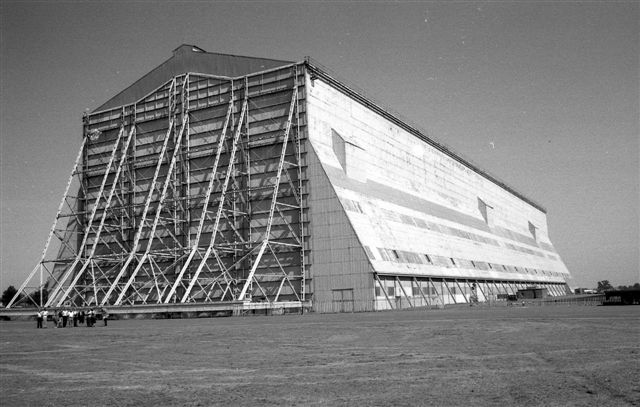
RAF Cardington near Bedford was home to a large Balloon Command unit.

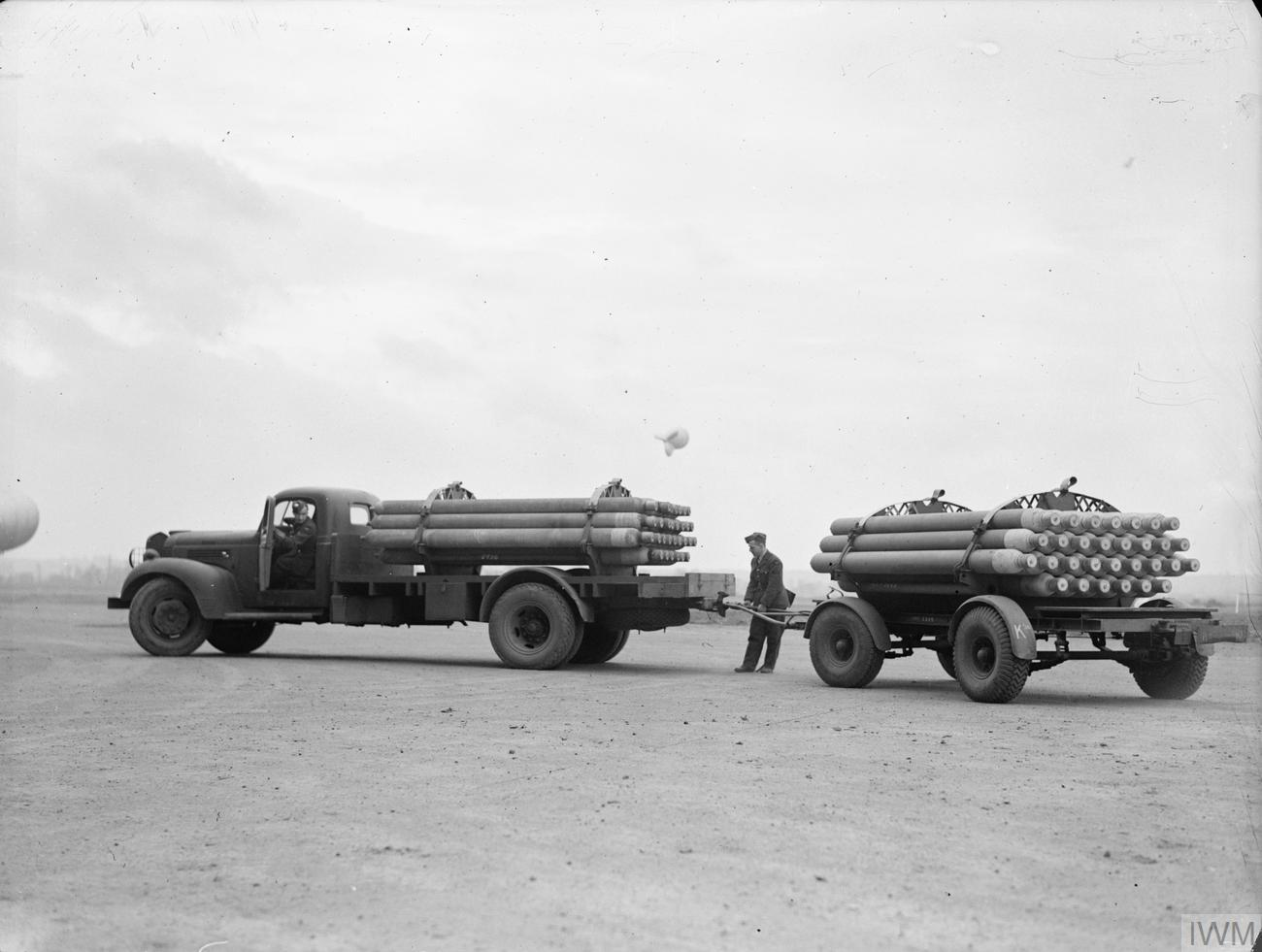
Dodge Type 'H' LHD cradle carrier, loaded with gas bottles.

== See also ==
- Royal Auxiliary Air Force
- List of Royal Air Force commands
