= Baron Portal of Hungerford =

Extinct barony in the Peerage of the United Kingdom

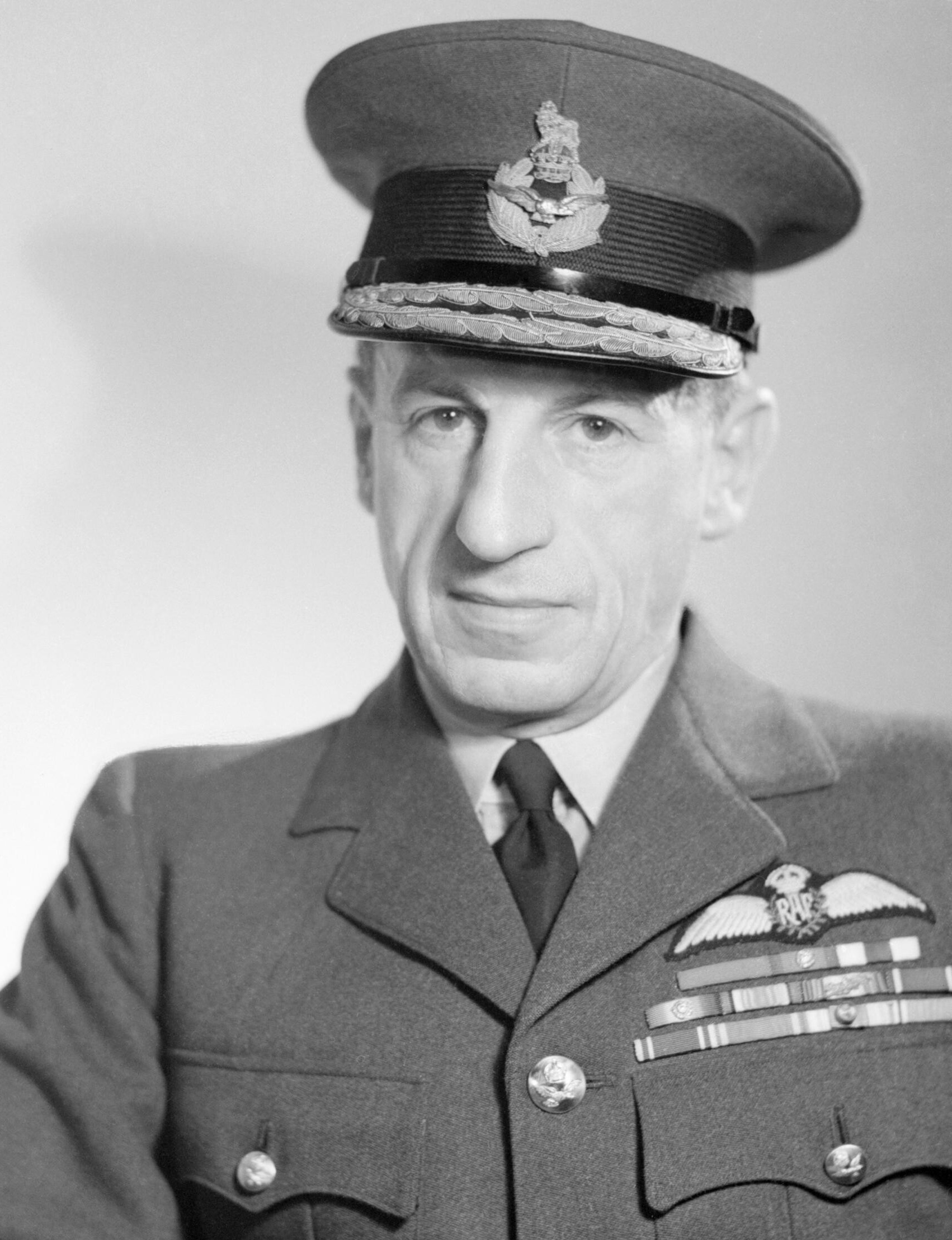
Charles Portal, 1st Viscount Portal of Hungerford.

Baron Portal of Hungerford, of Hungerford in the County of Berkshire, was a title in the Peerage of the United Kingdom. It was created in 1945 for Marshal of the Royal Air Force Sir Charles Portal upon his retirement as Chief of the Air Staff, with remainder in default of male issue to his daughter and the heirs male of her body. In 1946 Portal was further honoured when he was created Viscount Portal of Hungerford, of Hungerford in the County of Berkshire, also in the Peerage of the United Kingdom, with normal remainder to the heirs male of his body. The viscountcy became extinct on Lord Portal of Hungerford's death in 1971 as he left no surviving sons, while he was succeeded in the barony according to the special remainder by his daughter Rosemary. She sat as a cross-bencher in the House of Lords. The barony became extinct on her death without issue in 1990.

== Baron Portal of Hungerford (1945) ==
- Charles Frederick Algernon Portal, 1st Baron Portal of Hungerford (created Viscount Portal in 1946)

== Viscount Portal of Hungerford (1946) ==
- Charles Frederick Algernon Portal, 1st Viscount Portal of Hungerford (1893–1971)

== Baron Portal of Hungerford (1945; Reverted) ==
- Rosemary Portal, 2nd Baroness Portal of Hungerford (1923–1990)

== Arms ==
Coat of arms of Baron Portal of Hungerford
Crest Issuant from an astral crown Or a portal between two towers Proper. Escutcheon Argent a lion rampant Sable between a fleur-de-lys Azure and a rose Gules barbed and seeded Proper on a chief of the third an astral crown Or. Supporters Dexter a pilot of the Royal Air Force, sinister a mechanic of the Royal Air Force, both in service dress Proper. Motto Armet Nos Ultio Regum
