= Abraham Portal =

English goldsmith and dramatist

Abraham Portal (baptised 1726 – 1809) was an English goldsmith and dramatist.

== Life ==
He was the son of a clergyman, Peter William Portal, of Huguenot origin. He started in life as a goldsmith and jeweller on Ludgate Hill, but lost money both in this trade and as a bookseller, and finished his career as a box-keeper at Drury Lane Theatre. It appears from his Poems that Portal was a close friend of John Langhorne. Other friends were Edmund Cartwright and John Scott of Amwell.

His brother was the Rev. Andrew Portal, headmaster and usher of Abingdon School.

In the spring of 1796 Portal seems to have been living in Castle Street, Holborn.

== Works ==
Portal's writings include:

- Olindo and Sophronia: a Tragedy, the story taken from Torquato Tasso, two editions, 1758, London.
- The Indiscreet Lover: a Comedy, performed at the Haymarket for the benefit of the British Lying-In Hospital in Brownlow Street; dedicated to the Duke of Portland; two editions, London, 1768. To the printed copies is appended a list of "errata", in which the reader is requested to substitute polite periphrases for coarse expressions in the text.
- Songs, Duets, and Finale, from Portal's comic opera The Cady of Bagdad, London, 1778. The opera, which was given at Drury Lane on 19 February 1778, was not printed; the music was by Thomas Linley the elder.
- Poems, 1781. The volume includes dedicatory verses to Richard Brinsley Sheridan, and two bombastic poems, War: an Ode, and Innocence: a Poetical Essay, which had previously been issued separately.
- Vortimer, or the True Patriot: a Tragedy, London, 1796. Among the dramatis personæ are Vortimer's father Vortigern, his mother Rowena, Hengist, and Horsa. Samuel Ireland's Vortigern and Rowena had appeared in March 1795.

Neither Vortimer nor Olindo and Sophronia was acted.

== Family ==
Portal married Elizabeth Nethersole in 1748; they had a son, who died young, and she died in 1758. He then married Elizabeth Bedwell, and they had nine children. Of these Ann Cracroft Portal married Moreton Walhouse, and was step-mother of Edward John Littleton, 1st Baron Hatherton.
