= 6th Battalion, Royal Warwickshire Regiment =

6th Bn, Royal Warwickshire Regiment 69th (Royal Warwickshire) HAA Rgt, RA 469th (Royal Warwickshire) HAA Rgt, RA
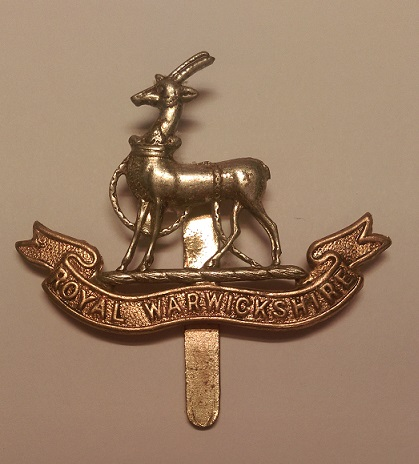
- Royal Warwickshire Regiment Cap Badge
- Active: 1908–1961
- Country: United Kingdom
- Branch: Territorial Army
- Role: Infantry; Air Defence
- Garrison/HQ: Thorp Street, Birmingham (1908–36); Kings Heath, Birmingham (1937–55)
- Engagements: World War I: Battle of the Somme; Battle of Fromelles; Third Battle of Ypres; Battle of Cambrai; German spring offensive; Hundred Days Offensive; Italian Front; World War II: The Blitz; Siege of Tobruk; Italian Campaign

The 6th Battalion, Royal Warwickshire Regiment (6th Royal Warwicks) was a unit of Britain's Territorial Army (TA) from 1908 until 1961. Recruited from Birmingham, it served as infantry in some of the bloodiest fighting on the Western Front and in Italy during World War I. Converted to an Anti-Aircraft (AA) role, it defended the West Midlands during The Blitz in the early part of World War II, and then joined Eighth Army in North Africa, including service in the famous Siege of Tobruk and in the Italian Campaign. It served on in the air defence role in the postwar TA until 1961.

== Volunteers ==
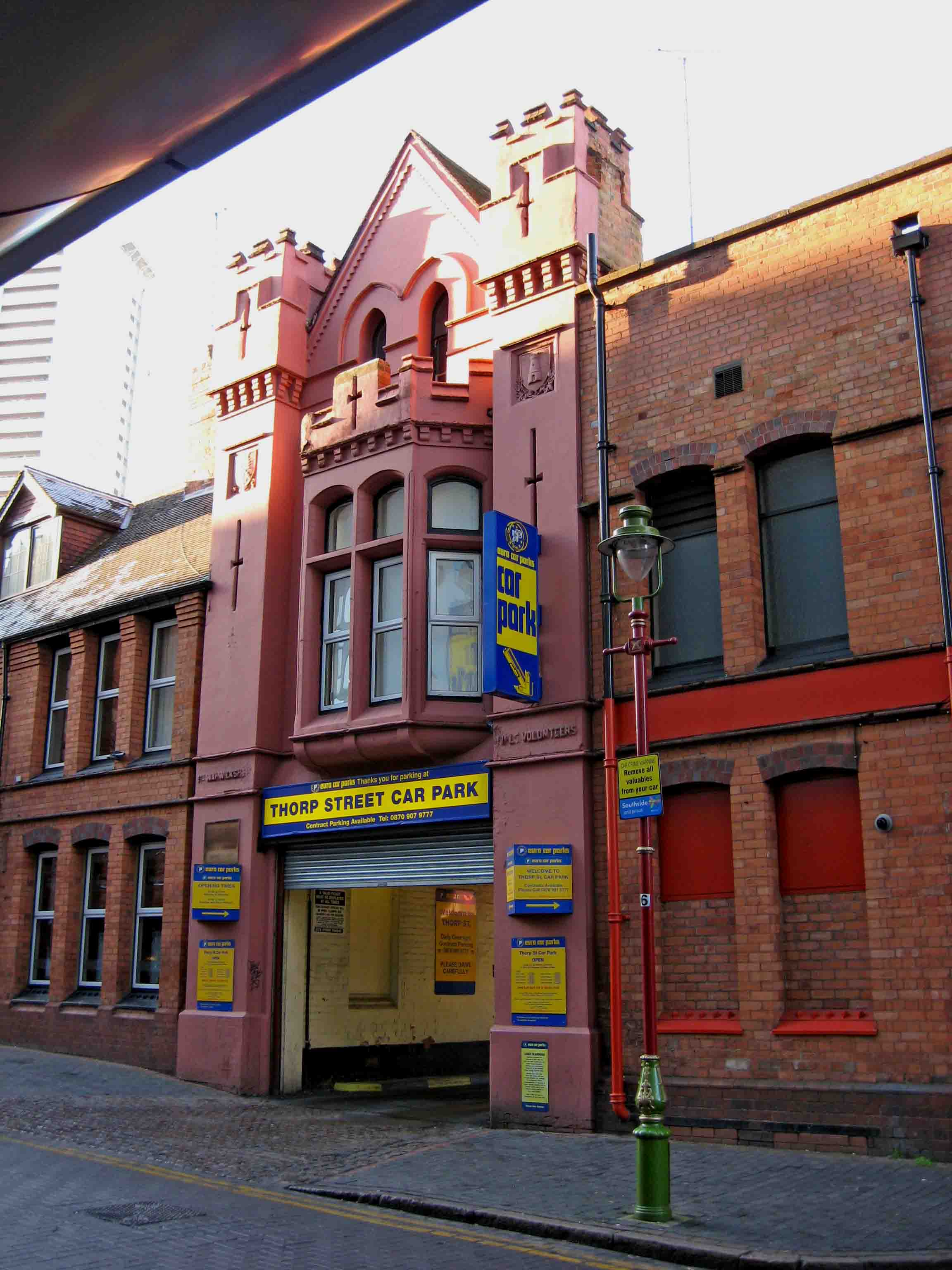
Thorp Street Drill Hall, shared by the Birmingham battalions of the Royal Warwicks – now a car park.

The enthusiasm for the Volunteer movement following an invasion scare in 1859 saw the creation of many Rifle Volunteer Corps (RVCs) composed of part-time soldiers eager to supplement the Regular British Army in time of need. One such unit was the 1st (Birmingham Rifles) Warwickshire RVC.

Under the 'Localisation of Forces' scheme introduced by the Cardwell reforms, the Volunteers in Warwickshire were grouped with the two Regular battalions of the 6th Foot (Royal Warwickshire Regiment) and, following the Childers Reforms, the battalion was designated the 1st Volunteer Battalion of the Royal Warwickshire Regiment in 1883. On 1 January 1891, the unit reorganised as a double battalion (referred to as A and B Battalions, or more confusingly as 1st and 2nd Battalions).

== Territorial Force ==
When the Volunteers were subsumed into the Territorial Force (TF) in 1908 as part of the Haldane Reforms, the 1st and 2nd Battalions of the Birmingham Rifles became the 5th Battalion, Royal Warwickshire Regiment and 6th Battalion, Royal Warwickshire Regiment respectively and adopted the red uniform with blue facings of the Royal Warwickshires. The 5th and 6th Battalions continued to share a drill hall at Thorp Street, Birmingham, and both were in the Warwickshire Brigade of the TF's South Midland Division.

== World War I ==
=== Mobilisation ===
On the outbreak of war in August 1914 the units of the South Midland Division had just set out for annual training when orders recalled them to their home depots for mobilisation. 6th Royal Warwicks mobilised at Thorp Street under its commanding officer (CO) Lt-Col E. Martineau, VD. The division then concentrated around Chelmsford where it formed part of Central Force. While the battalions trained for overseas service, so-called 2nd-Line battalions were authorised on 31 August to be formed at the home depots from men who either had not volunteered for overseas service or were unfit, together with the recruits flooding in. Thus the parent battalion at Chelmsford was designated the 1/6th Bn, that at Birmingham was the 2/6th Bn. Later a 3rd-Line or reserve battalion was also formed to train drafts for the other two.

=== 1/6th Royal Warwicks ===
The South Midland Division was selected to proceed to France to join the British Expeditionary Force (BEF) early in 1915, and the 1/6th Royal Warwicks disembarked at Le Havre at the beginning of April. Within days it began learning the routine of trench warfare around St Yves, Messines and Ploegsteert. On 12 May the division was designated the 48th (South Midland) Division and the brigade became the 143rd (Warwickshire) Brigade. The battalion later moved south to a section of the line around Hébuterne, Foncquevillers and Gommecourt. It was still in this area a year later when the Battle of the Somme began.

==== Somme ====
Although 48th Division was in Corps Reserve for the First day on the Somme, two battalions (1/6th and 1/8th Royal Warwicks) were detailed to attack with 11th Brigade leading the assault of 4th Division towards 'Redan Ridge'. Even before Zero hour the 'jumping-off' trenches came under fire from 'crumps' of enemy artillery, and machine guns began playing over No man's land from both flanks. 1/8th Royal Warwicks was shielded by the ground from direct fire and managed to get into the German second line and into 'Quadrilateral Redoubt' (the Heidenkopf, which German engineers had blown up too early). 1/6th Battalion, following up, passed the Quadrilateral. The right hand companies of both battalions pushed on and made contact with the rest of 11th Brigade in 'Munich Trench', but the left companies suffered heavy casualties from the village of Serre, which 31st Division had been unable to reach. 4th Division's support brigades now arrived: it was too late to stop their leading battalions, who also suffered heavy casualties crossing No man's land to join 11th Brigade. Although 4th Division had broken into the German positions, it now came under attack from both flanks, many of the men who had advanced furthest being cut off and shot down. Running short of hand grenades and ammunition, and attacked by German troops moving down from Serre, the survivors were forced back from Munich Trench to the Quadrilateral. The brigadier and all the battalion commanders of 11th Brigade had become casualties (Lt-Col H. Franklin of 1/6th Royal Warwicks was wounded) and the survivors of 11th Brigade was withdrawn in the afternoon, leaving the rest of the division to try to hold the foothold in the Quadrilateral. The 1/8th Royal Warwicks had suffered heavier casualties than any other TF battalion on the First day on the Somme, and those of 1/6th were not far behind with 466 casualties.

The 1/6th Bn was involved in the following further operations while serving on the Western Front:

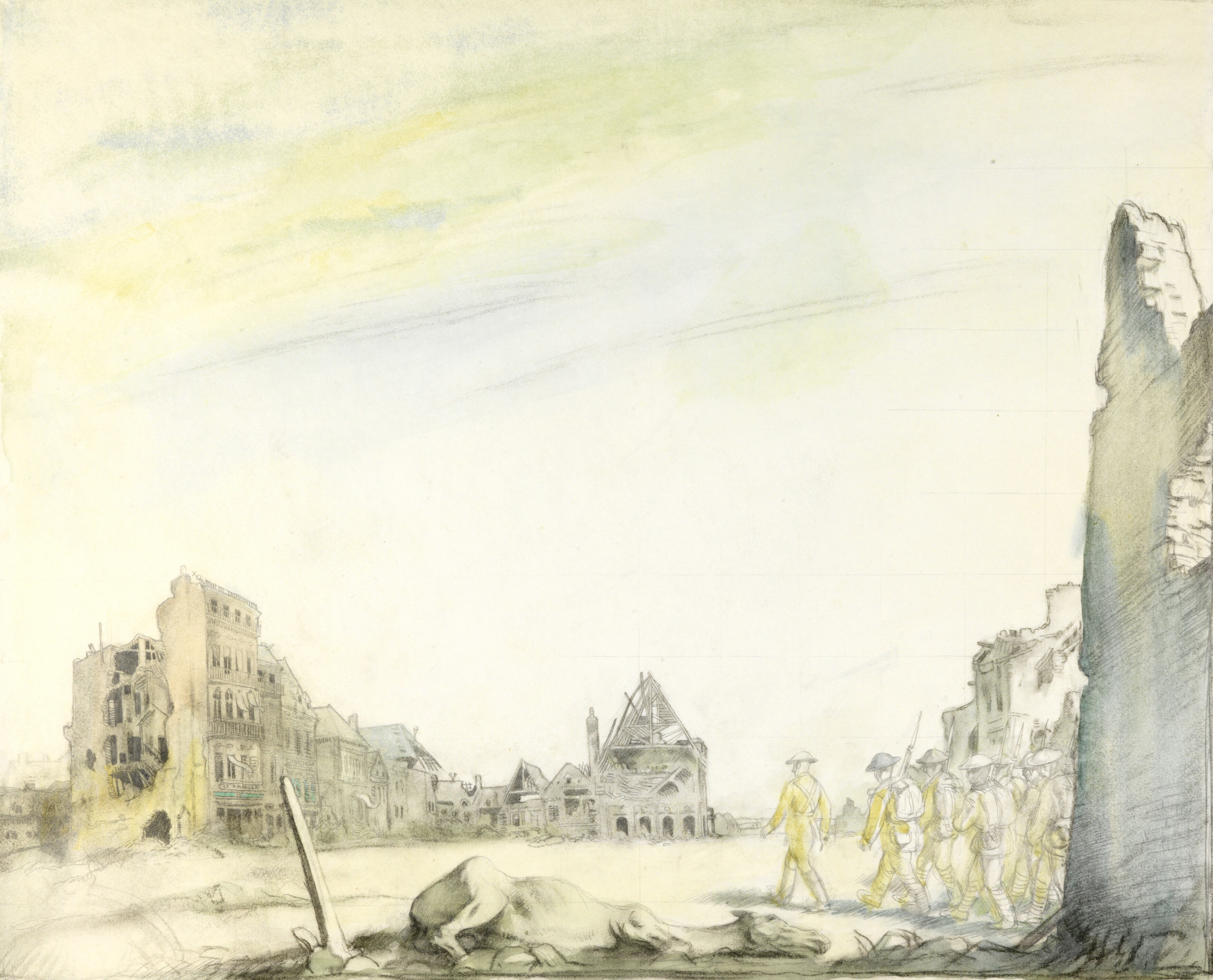
The Royal Warwickshires entering Peronne, March 1917, by William Orpen.

- Battle of the Somme:
  - Battle of Bazentin Ridge, 15–17 July
  - Capture of Ovillers-la-Boisselle, 17 July
  - Battle of Pozières Ridge, 23–27 July and 13–28 August 1916
  - Battle of the Ancre Heights, 3–11 November 1916
  - Battle of the Ancre, 13–18 November 1916
- German Retreat to the Hindenburg Line, 14 March–5 April 1917:
  - Occupation of Peronne, 18 March 1916
- Third Battle of Ypres:
  - Battle of Langemarck, 16–18 August 1917
  - Battle of Polygon Wood, 28 September–3 October 1917
  - Battle of Broodseinde, 4 October 1917
  - Battle of Poelcappelle, 9 October 1917

==== Italy ====
On 10 November 1917, the 48th Division received orders to move to Italy. By 1 December, the units had finished detraining around Legnago on the Adige. On 1 March 1918, the division relieved 7th Division in the front line of the Montello sector on the Piave Front, and held the line until 16 March. On 1 April, it moved westward into reserve for the middle sector of the Asiago Plateau Front. It remained in Italy for the remainder of the war, taking part in the following operations:

- Battle of the Piave River:
  - Fighting on the Asiago Plateau, 15–16 June 1918
- Battle of Vittorio Veneto:
  - Fighting in the Val d'Assa, 1–4 November 1918

On 3 November 1918, at Osteria del Termine, the division surrounded and captured a large force of Austrian troops including the corps commander and three divisional commanders. By 15.00 on 4 November, when the Armistice with Austria came into force, the division had pushed forward into the Trentino. After the conclusion of hostilities, the division was withdrawn to Italy for the winter. Demobilisation began in 1919 and the battalion completed this complete on 2 May.

=== 2/6th Royal Warwicks ===
The 2/6th Bn was formed in Birmingham in October 1914, but at first the men lived at home, and little or nothing was available in terms of uniforms, arms or equipment. It was not until the 2nd South Midland Division concentrated at Northampton in January 1915 that the men were issued with .256-in Japanese Ariska rifles with which to train. Here they formed part of First Army of Central Force, but when the 1st South Midland Division went to France, the 2nd took its place at Chelmsford and became part of Third Army of Central Force, with a definite role in Home Defence. The battalions formed their machine gun sections while at Chelmsford, but the strength of the units fluctuated widely as they were drawn upon for drafts for their 1st-Line battalions. In August 1915 the division was numbered as the 61st (2nd South Midland) Division and the brigade became the 182nd (2nd Warwickshire) Brigade.

In February and March 1916, the units of 61st Division moved to Salisbury Plain to begin final training for overseas service. Here they were issued with .303 SMLE service rifles in place of the Japanese weapons, and Lewis guns in place of dummy guns and antique Maxim guns. Final leave was granted in April and May and the division entrained for France, concentrating at IX Corps' rest area by 28 May.

The 2/6th Bn's first action was the Battle of Fromelles on 19 July 1916, a diversionary attack in support of the Somme Offensive. The attack was badly handled and casualties were heavy. The 61st Division was so badly mauled that it was not used offensively again in 1916. Thereafter, the battalion was involved in the following operations:

- Operations on the Ancre, 11–15 January 1917
- German Retreat to the Hindenburg Line, 14 March–5 April 1917
- Battle of Langemarck, 16–18 August 1917
- Battle of Cambrai:
- German counter-attacks, 1–3 December 1917.

Due to the manpower shortage being suffered by the BEF, 2/5th Royal Warwicks was disbanded on 20 February 1918, some of the men being drafted into the 2/6th Bn.

==== Spring Offensive ====
On the day before the German spring offensive opened, 61st Division was in the line 2 miles (3.2 km) north of St Quentin when 2/6th Royal Warwicks was ordered to raid the enemy line. A and C Companies made the raid on Cepy Farm at 22.00 and obtained prisoners from three regiments and two separate divisions, indicating that the German lines were packed ready for an attack. Indeed, the prisoners were anxious to be taken to the rear because they knew the German bombardment was due at 04.40 the following morning, 21 March. Unfortunately, this priceless information was not widely disseminated before the attack (the Battle of St Quentin) began.

The front held by 61st Division opposite St Quentin was one of the few sectors where the attackers were delayed. Redoubts in the Forward Zone held out for most of the day and prevented the Germans from penetrating far into the Battle Zone, which was successfully held by 2/6th Royal Warwicks and four other battalions. Unfortunately, the Germans had fresh divisions to throw into the attack the next day, and although the division took a heavy toll on them, its neighbours had been driven back and it was ordered to retire. It was then involved in the Actions to defend the Somme Crossings on 24–25 March.

The much-reduced 61st Division was relieved on 27 March and immediately taken north by lorry to make a counter-attack the following day at Lamotte near Villers-Bretonneux. This attack was shot down yards from the objective. The exhausted remnants were finally pulled out of the line on 30 March. During the rest of Spring 1918 the battalion was involved in the following operations in the Battle of the Lys:

- Battle of Estaires, 11 April, when the 61st Division arrived just in time to prevent the destruction of the 51st (Highland) Division
- Battle of Hazebrouck, 12–15 April
- Battle of Béthune, 18 April

==== Hundred Days Offensive ====
As the Allied Hundred Days Offensive gathered pace, the 61st Division was committed to minor operations during the pursuit to the Haute Deule Canal. On 1 October, 182nd and 184th Bdes attacked behind a deep barrage at 05.40 against little resistance and then followed German rearguards over broken ground well beyond the original objectives. It then went into reserve until the Battle of the Selle on 24 October, when it was ordered to cross the Ecaillon stream. 2/6th and 2/7th Royal Warwicks got into trouble here, because there was uncut barbed wire on both sides of the stream valley that had been missed by the barrage. Only a few men were able to struggle across and maintain themselves against counter-attacks for the rest of the day.

At the Battle of Valenciennes, which began on 1 November, the British troops could not attack Valenciennes directly because it was full of French civilians and refugees. Instead, the army swept round it by the south, 61st Division given the objectives of Maresches and Saint Hubert. 182nd Brigade made the main attack in the early morning, crossing the Rhonelle at Artres by footbridges thrown across by the Royal Engineers; 2/6th Royal Warwicks was in support. At first all went well, until the advance was held up by machine gun fire from St Hubert. But at 09.30 a strong German counter-attack was made, supported by captured British tanks, which pushed the brigade's flank back to the Rhonelle. Some of the tanks were knocked out by British artillery that had crossed at Artres.

61st Division was relieved in the front line during the night of 2/3 November and remained halted south of Valenciennes when the Armistice with Germany came into force on 11 November. It was then withdrawn to Doullens, where demobilisation began in January 1919, but from January to June parts of the division were used to maintain order among foreign workers at the base ports. Troops not yet due for demobilisation were sent as drafts to units in Egypt and the Black Sea, and the rest went home in July. The battalion was disbanded in France on 20 September.

=== 3/6th Royal Warwicks ===
The 3/6th battalion was formed in Birmingham in May 1915 and joined the South Midland Reserve Group. It became the 6th (Reserve) Bn Royal Warwicks on 8 April 1916, and was absorbed into the 5th Reserve Bn on 1 September that year.

== Interwar ==
The 6th Battalion, Royal Warwickshire Regiment, was reformed on 7 February 1920, and the TF was reorganised as the Territorial Army in 1921. Two companies of the battalion paraded at Thorp Street on Monday each week, the other two on Wednesday, while 5th Royal Warwicks paraded on Tuesdays and Thursdays. Once again, both battalions formed part of 143rd (Warwickshire) Infantry Brigade in the 48th (South Midland) Infantry Division. The 4th (Schools) Cadet Bn, Royal Warwickshire Regiment, the Harborne Training School Cadet Corps and the Norton Training School Cadet Corps were affiliated to the battalion.

=== Anti-Aircraft conversion ===
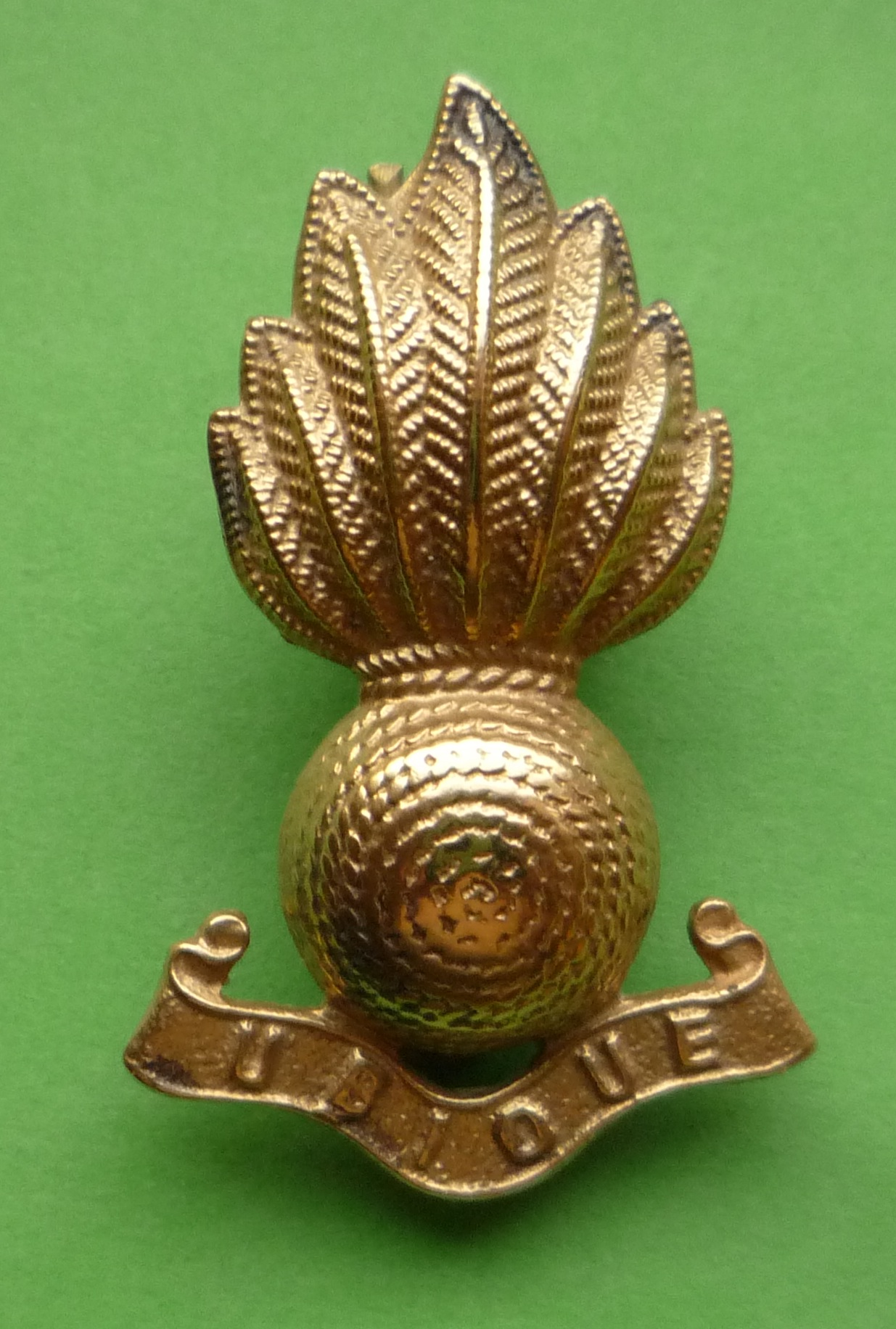
Royal Artillery collar badge

In the 1930s, the increasing need for anti-aircraft (AA) defence for Britain's cities was addressed by converting a number of Territorial infantry battalions into AA units of the Royal Artillery (RA) or the Royal Engineers (RE). The 6th Royal Warwicks was one unit selected for this role, becoming 69th (Royal Warwickshire Regiment) Anti-Aircraft Brigade, Royal Artillery on 9 December 1936, consisting of HQ and four batteries (190, 191, 192 AA Btys and 69 AA Machine Gun Bty, which became 199 AA Bty on 1 May 1937). 69th AA Bde continued to wear its Royal Warwicks cap badge, together with RA collar badges. At the same time, 5th Royal Warwicks converted to 45th (The Royal Warwickshire Regiment) AA Battalion, RE (a searchlight unit). Since the establishment of an searchlight battalion was much larger than an infantry battalion or an AA gun brigade, 69th AA Bde moved out of Thorp Street to Brandwood House, Kings Heath, (RHQ, 192 and 199 AA Btys) and Fernbank House, Alum Rock Road (190 and 191 AA Btys). Both new units were subordinated to 32nd (South Midland) Anti-Aircraft Group in 2nd Anti-Aircraft Division. On 1 January 1939, the RA's AA gun 'brigades' (such as the 69th) became regiments, and the AA Groups adopted the more usual designation of brigades.

Bishop Vesey's Grammar School Cadet Corps and the Norton Training School Cadet Corps were affiliated to the regiment.

== World War II ==
=== Mobilisation ===
The TA's AA units were mobilised on 23 September 1938 during the Munich Crisis, with units manning their emergency positions within 24 hours, even though many did not yet have their full complement of men or equipment. The emergency lasted three weeks, and they were stood down on 13 October. In February 1939 the existing AA defences came under the control of a new Anti-Aircraft Command. In June a partial mobilisation of TA units was begun in a process known as 'couverture', whereby each AA unit did a month's tour of duty in rotation to man selected AA and searchlight positions. On 24 August, ahead of the declaration of war, AA Command was fully mobilised at its war stations.

By the outbreak of war the 69th (Royal Warwickshire) AA Regiment had moved to the command of the Coventry-based 34th (South Midland) Anti-Aircraft Brigade in 4th AA Division. At that stage, the three heavy AA regiments in 34th AA Bde had a total of 32 serviceable guns, plus four out of action, to cover the Gun Defended Areas of Birmingham and Coventry. 69th Regiment's share by midnight on 24 August was 4 × 3-inch and 2 × 3.7-inch guns at Coventry and 4 × 3.7-inch at Birmingham, together with crews manning Light machine guns (LMGs) at Vital Points (VPs) in the two cities. On 26 August Regimental HQ (RHQ) opened at the Westfield House TA Centre in Coventry.

=== Phoney War ===
Once war was declared, there was little to do. 69th AA Regiment sent parties to help Warwickshire farmers with the harvest. 191 Bty moved to Newport, Wales, with its 3-inch guns on 9 September, being replaced at Coventry by guns from Manchester. The regiment's active guns at Birmingham and Coventry were now all 3-7-inch or 4.5-inch. RHQ moved from Coventry to Castle Bromwich on 16 September. On 24 September 190 AA Bty was temporarily broken up among the other three, and its Battery HQ (BHQ) became the cadre for training recruits. A group of officers from the regiment volunteered to join the Regular 4th AA Rgt for service with the British Expeditionary Force (BEF) in France.

191 HAA Battery returned from Wales on 6 November, and at the end of the year the regiment was manning 12 × 4.5-inch and 11 × 3.7-inch guns at sites round Birmingham, 4 × 3.7-inch guns at Coventry, and 8 LMGs at Ryton. By the end of February 1940 it had been concentrated at sites in the Birmingham Gun Zone, manning 12 × 4.5-inch and 14 × 3.7-inch guns, rising to 16 × 4.5-inch and 24 × 3.7-inch by the end of June, having been joined by 228 (Edinburgh) AA Bty from 94th AA Rgt. On 7 July 228 AA Bty left the regiment and moved to Crewe, and its sites in the Birmingham Gun Zone were taken over by 60th (City of London) AA Rgt.

On 1 June 1940, along with other units equipped with 3-inch or heavier guns, the 69th was designated a Heavy AA (HAA) Regiment. GL Mk I gun-laying radar began to be delivered to the regiment's gun sites during the summer, and Lt-Col P.L. Vining took over as CO on 6 July.

=== Battle of Britain and Blitz ===
Although most of the Luftwaffe air raids during the Battle of Britain and the early part of The Blitz concentrated on London and the South and East Coasts, the West Midlands also suffered badly, with Birmingham and Coventry experiencing heavy raids in August and October. The regiment's guns were very active on the nights of 15/16 and 17/18 October, with some firing on 31 October/1 November and considerable activity on 1/2 November.

On 6 October, 191 HAA Bty became an independent unit under War Office control and its gunsites were taken over by 177 (County of Durham) HAA Bty, which was attached to the regiment from 63rd (Northumbrian) HAA Rgt. Then on 4 November the regiment received the order to mobilise for overseas service. Its gunsites were taken over by batteries from 3 and 7 AA Divisions (including 177 HAA Bty), and 190, 192 and 199 HAA Btys arrived at the mobilisation centre at Southend-on-Sea on 14 November. (The regiment therefore missed the notorious bombing raid that destroyed Coventry on the night of 14/15 November.) While at Southend, one Troop of 484 (Carmarthenshire) Searchlight (S/L) Bty (also awaiting embarkation) was attached to it, and Lt-Col Mortimer Ruffer took over as CO on 18 November.

=== Malta ===
190 HAA Battery, together with the recently independent 191 HAA Bty and 484 Independent S/L Bty, sailed to Malta, where the HAA batteries reinforced 10th HAA Rgt. The island was under heavy air attack and the AA reinforcements were desperately needed.

=== Middle East ===
However, the move overseas was cancelled for the rest of the regiment (RHQ, 192 and 199 Btys), which waited at Southend until 25 February 1941 when the order to mobilise was repeated. It left AA Command and became part of the War Office Reserve, and then proceeded to the port of embarkation on 17 March.

69th (Warwickshire) HAA Rgt sailed round Africa and disembarked at Port Suez in Egypt on 6 May. After a period at a transit camp, RHQ and 192 HAA Bty took over guard duties at No 304 Prisoner of War (PoW) camp from a New Zealand unit on 29 June. Then, on 18 July, 192 Bty began taking over HAA gunsites in the Alexandria area.

=== Tobruk ===
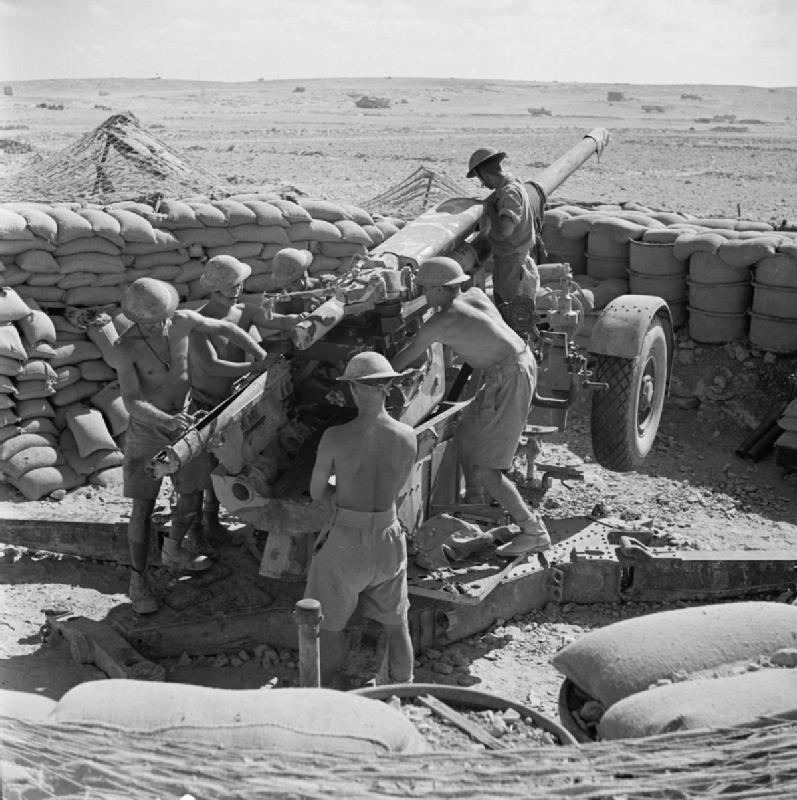
Gunners cleaning a 3.7-inch anti-aircraft gun near Tobruk, 19 August 1941.

On 17 August 1941, RHQ embarked at Alexandria aboard HMAS Nizam of the 'Tobruk Ferry Service', which sailed during the night to the besieged port of Tobruk. There it joined 4 AA Bde in the garrison. Lieutenant-Colonel Ruffer took over as AA Defence Commander (AADC) for Tobruk Harbour and RHQ 69th HAA Rgt took control of the AA units round the harbour:

- 152 (London) HAA Bty of 51st (London) HAA Rgt
- 153 (London) HAA Bty (part) of 51st HAA Rgt
- 235 (Kent) HAA Bty of 89th (Cinque Ports) HAA Rgt attached to 51st HAA Rgt
- 40 LAA Bty of 14th (West Lothian, Royal Scots) LAA Rgt
- 306 S/L Bty (detachment) of 27th (London Electrical Engineers) S/L Rgt – 10 × 90 cm S/L projectors
- 51 HAA Rgt Signal Section, Royal Corps of Signals (RCS)
- 51 HAA Rgt Workshop Section, Royal Army Ordnance Corps (RAOC)
- 13 LAA Rgt Section, Royal Army Service Corps (RASC)

152/51 and 235/89 HAA Btys each had two captured Italian 102mm guns in addition to their 3.7-inch guns; the LAA Bty was manning a mixture of Bofors 40 mm guns, Italian Breda 20mm guns and LMGs.

General Erwin Rommel had attacked with his Afrika Korps in Cyrenaica in April 1941, forcing the British Western Desert Force (WDF) back past Tobruk. 51st (London) HAA Rgt had retreated inside the Tobruk perimeter, and had been reinforced by sea by 235 (Kent) HAA Bty with static 3.7-inch guns just before the ring closed round the port on 11 April, beginning the epic 240-day long Siege of Tobruk. The Official History records that the AA artillery was 'incessantly in action against attacks of all kinds, from all heights, but especially by dive-bombers'. The usual targets were the harbour, airfields, base installations, and the AA and field gun positions. Early in the siege, RHQ and 152 HAA Bty of 51st HAA Rgt were attacked by Junkers Ju 87 Stukas and suffered serious casualties; the RHQ was evacuated by sea and had to be replaced temporarily by HQ of 13th LAA Rgt. After RHQ of 69th HAA Rgt arrived to take over, it was followed by 192 HAA Bty to relieve 152 HAA Bty.

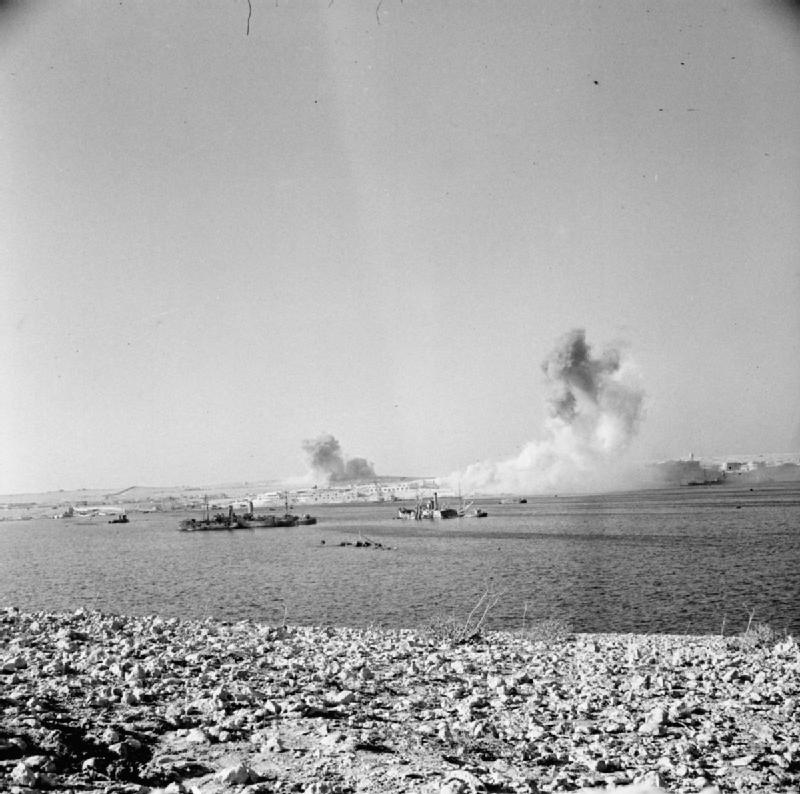
German bombs explode during one of the heaviest air raids on Tobruk. The photograph was taken from a trench adjoining an AA gun.

The Royal Artillery historian notes that the Stuka attacks concentrated on gun positions, which was a serious threat to HAA sites, whose instruments could not cope with the rapid height changes. The gunners devised a tactic of opening fire with short fuzes just before the dive started, to force the pilots to fly through a ring of bursts. The battery cooks, drivers and clerks then joined in, firing LMGs and captured Bredas. This aggressive method was known as 'Porcupine', and was so effective that the Luftwaffe changed to high-level bombing. For example, on 27 August and 1 September, RHQ's Bren and Lewis LMGs were in action against raids by Junkers Ju 88s and Ju 87s; on the latter day they claimed hits against two Ju 87s, 'which went off smoking and appeared to be in trouble'.

Each mobile HAA troop established at least one alternative site and the guns were regularly switched between them, the empty sites being rigged up as dummies. The two available GL radar sets had to be positioned away from the vulnerable gun sites and used for early warning to supplement the single Royal Air Force (RAF) radar, and a ring of searchlights operated round the harbour at night. Harbour defence was by pre-arranged barrages by five of the six HAA troops, the sixth troop remaining on watch for other raiders. 4 AA Brigade recorded that there was a steady decline in numbers of aircraft attacking as the siege went on, with the attackers switching to high-level and night attacks.

There was an alert for possible paratroop attack on 19 November when four Junkers Ju 52 transport aircraft flew low along the coast: one was shot down by fire from RHQ's LMGs and Shrapnel shells from 153 HAA Bty. In the last two months of the siege, troops of HAA guns took it in turn to move out to the perimeter and take on ground targets under the control of 9th Australian Division. Their long-range harassing fire made up for the shortage of medium artillery. For example, RHQ 69th HAA Rgt controlled Counter-battery shoots on 24 and 26 November.

Tobruk was relieved at the end of November 1941. By then the harbour defences under 69th HAA Rgt were:

- 153/51 HAA Bty – 4 × 3.7-inch (mobile)
- 192/69 HAA Bty – 8 × 3.7-inch (mobile)
- 235/89 HAA Bty – 8 × 3.7-inch (static)
- 277/68 HAA Bty – 7 × 3.7-inch (mobile)
- 292/94 HAA Bty – 8 × 3.7-inch (mobile)
- 39/13 LAA Bty – 3 × Bofors, 9 × Breda (came under command 20 December)
- 40/14 LAA Bty – 12 × Bofors, 1 × twin Breda
- Detachment 57/14 LAA Bty – 1 × Bofors, 3 × Breda
- Detachment 305/27 S/L Bty – 9 × S/L (came under command 18 December)
- Detachment 306/27 S/L Bty – 12 × S/L

Lieutenant-Colonel Ruffer, who had acted a brigade commander on occasions, was awarded the Distinguished Service Order (DSO) after the siege.

=== Egypt ===
After the relief, many of the AA units in Tobruk moved up in support of the advancing British Eighth Army, leaving 69th HAA Rgt at the port in command of various units passing through. In May 1942, 68th HAA Rgt HQ arrived to take over command of the AA defences. That month Rommel began a new attack into Cyrenaica. On 16 June, 69th HAA Rgt was ordered back to the Egyptian border with 192/69 and 261/94 HAA Btys, 51st HAA Rgt's signal and workshop sections, and 25th LAA Rgt's RASC transport section. It deployed at Sollum the following day, and therefore escaped the surrender of Tobruk four days later.

At Sollum, Lt-Col Ruffer was appointed AADC, and had four batteries of 61st LAA Rgt under his command, positioned to cover gaps in the barbed wire defences, later withdrawn to provide close AA protection for the field gun and HAA sites. One of the HAA sites was positioned beneath the escarpment at Halfaya ('Hellfire') Pass. On 22 June the retreat continued, and the regiment moved back to Mersa Matruh, and then El Dabaa, where it deployed until moved back again on 27 June to Amiriya. Here RHQ and 192 HAA Bty were joined by 200 (Derby) HAA Bty and deployed to protect RAF landing grounds, with 200 Bty at El Alamein. 200 HAA Battery had been part of 68th HAA Rgt, the rest of which was lost in Tobruk; it remained part of 69th HAA Rgt until 1945.

=== Alamein and after ===
The regiment was now under the orders of 2 AA Bde supporting Eighth Army's build-up by defending lines of communication. Enemy air activity preceding the Second Battle of El Alamein was sporadic, but during one attack on the railway 192 HAA Bty shot down three Messerschmitt Bf 109s. 51st HAA Regiment Signal Section was relieved by 74th (Glasgow) HAA Rgt Signal Section, and in August the regiment moved back to Alexandria.

Immediately after the Battle of Alamein (23 October–4 November), 69th HAA Rgt moved up behind the advancing Eighth Army to El Alamein, then on to Mersa Matruh, arriving on 11 November. Here it controlled 192/69 and 261/94 HAA Btys sited to defend the harbour, with 105/40, 165/55 and 166/56 LAA Btys defending the harbour and Smuggler's Cove. In addition, 8 × 6-pounder anti-tank guns of 296 A/T Bty provided coast defence while 204 Coast Defence Bty emplaced its guns. Other units, including 199 and 200 HAA Btys, and two troops of 390/27 S/L Bty, came and went as the army pushed on to Sollum, Tobruk and beyond.

On 20 November, RHQ was ordered up via Sidi Barrani to Benghazi, which had been captured that day. By early December the regiment was established at Bnghazi port with the following units under Lt-Col Ruffer's command as AADC:

- RHQ 69 HAA Rgt
  - 192, 199, 200 HAA Btys
- 213/57 HAA Bty
- 261/94 HAA Bty
- RHQ 2nd LAA Rgt
  - 6, 155 LAA Btys
- 390/27 S/L Bty (two Troops)
- 17 AA Operations Room (AAOR)
- 74th HAA Rgt Signal Section, RCS
- 69th HAA Rgt Workshop Section, Royal Electrical and Mechanical Engineers (REME)

213 and 261 HAA Btys were relieved by 51st (London) HAA Rgt (3 Btys) and 171/61 HAA Bty when they arrived and came under Ruffer's command in mid-December. By January, 69th HAA Rgt also had 135 'Z' Bty under its command, armed with 16 × Z Battery rocket projectors. 1 AA Brigade took over control of Benghazi while 2 AA Bde HQ accompanied Eighth Army's advance.

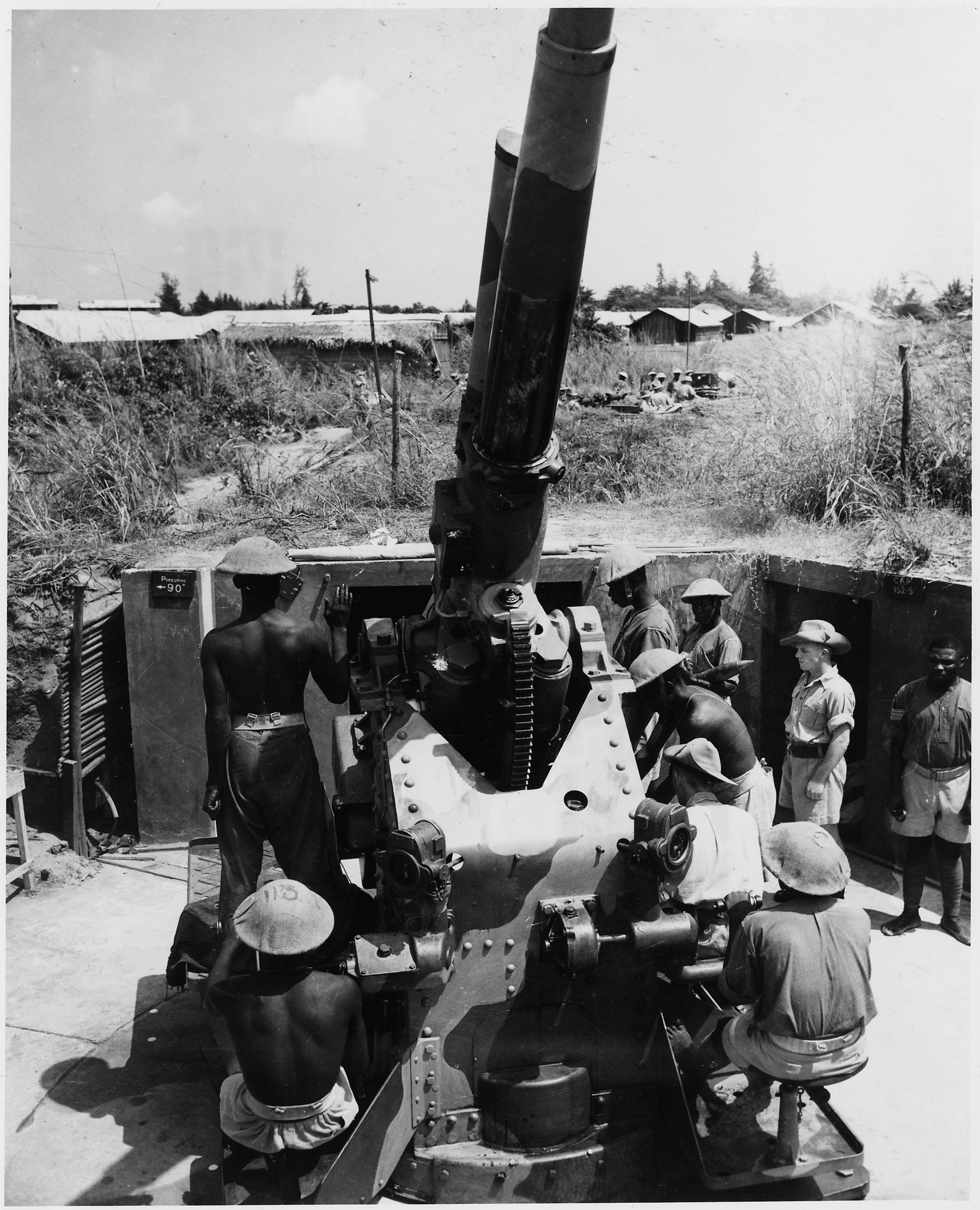
African gunners being trained on a 3.7-inch HAA gun.

In February 1943, the regiment moved up to Tripoli, which had fallen to Eighth Army on 23 January. Here it remained until the end of the Tunisian Campaign, coming under the command of 79 AA Bde. In April the regiment was 'diluted' (as the process was officially described) by 250 Bechuana troops of 1975 AA Company, African Pioneer Corps (APC), to be trained as gunners. (Note: Bechuana reinforcements received in 1944 were drawn from the Bangwaketse, Barolong and Lobatse tribes.) The regiment formed 651 HAA Bty as a cadre to accommodate the British gunners who were replaced and awaiting redeployment. The regiment also received extra AEC Matador gun tractors to make it fully mobile.

On 26 June, the regiment (less 200 HAA Bty) was ordered back to Cyrenaica, a 630-mile journey taking two days. It deployed to defend a group of USAAF landing grounds around Marble Arch, with Lt-Col Ruffer as AADC and 122/13 LAA Bty under command. However, the process was reversed at the end of July, when the regiment retraced its steps to Tripoli, rejoining 200 HAA Bty. 74th HAA Regiment Signal Section, which had been with the regiment for a year, was disbanded, and 69th HAA Rgt formed its own small Signal Detachment. On 10 August the regiment set out on the coast road once more, this time back to the Nile Delta, arriving at the end of the month, when the troops were given leave and training.

=== Taranto ===
The Italian Campaign began with Allied landings on 3 September. 69th HAA Regiment reorganised as a semi-mobile unit, and Lt-Col M.D. Burns took over as CO. The regiment then embarked on the Monarch of Bermuda at Alexandria on 18 September, landing at Taranto on 24 September, where it came under command of 8 AA Bde. The regiment provided the HAA defences for Taranto port for the rest of its wartime career. RHQ shared a building with 41 AAOR (later replaced by a Gun Operations Room (GOR) manned by 69th Rgt) and established cooperation with RAF and Italian Co-belligerent Navy and AA HQs, though the small signal detachment struggled to set up and maintain all the necessary communications. As AADC, Lt-Col Burns organised Taranto as an 'Inner Artillery Zone' in which AA guns had priority over fighters, with 233/75 (later 70 and 72/22) LAA Bty and the Royal Navy warships in the harbour included in the AA defences. 323 (Surrey) S/L Bty of 30th S/L Rgt ringed the harbour with 21 lights equipped with searchlight control radar (SLC or 'ELSIE') and 112 Company, Pioneer Corps, manned smoke dischargers. One Troop of 192 HAA Bty was sited on the island of San Pietro outside the harbour, and one Troop of 200 HAA Bty was detached to Lecce Airfield some 50 miles (80 km) away, with additional 20 mm guns.

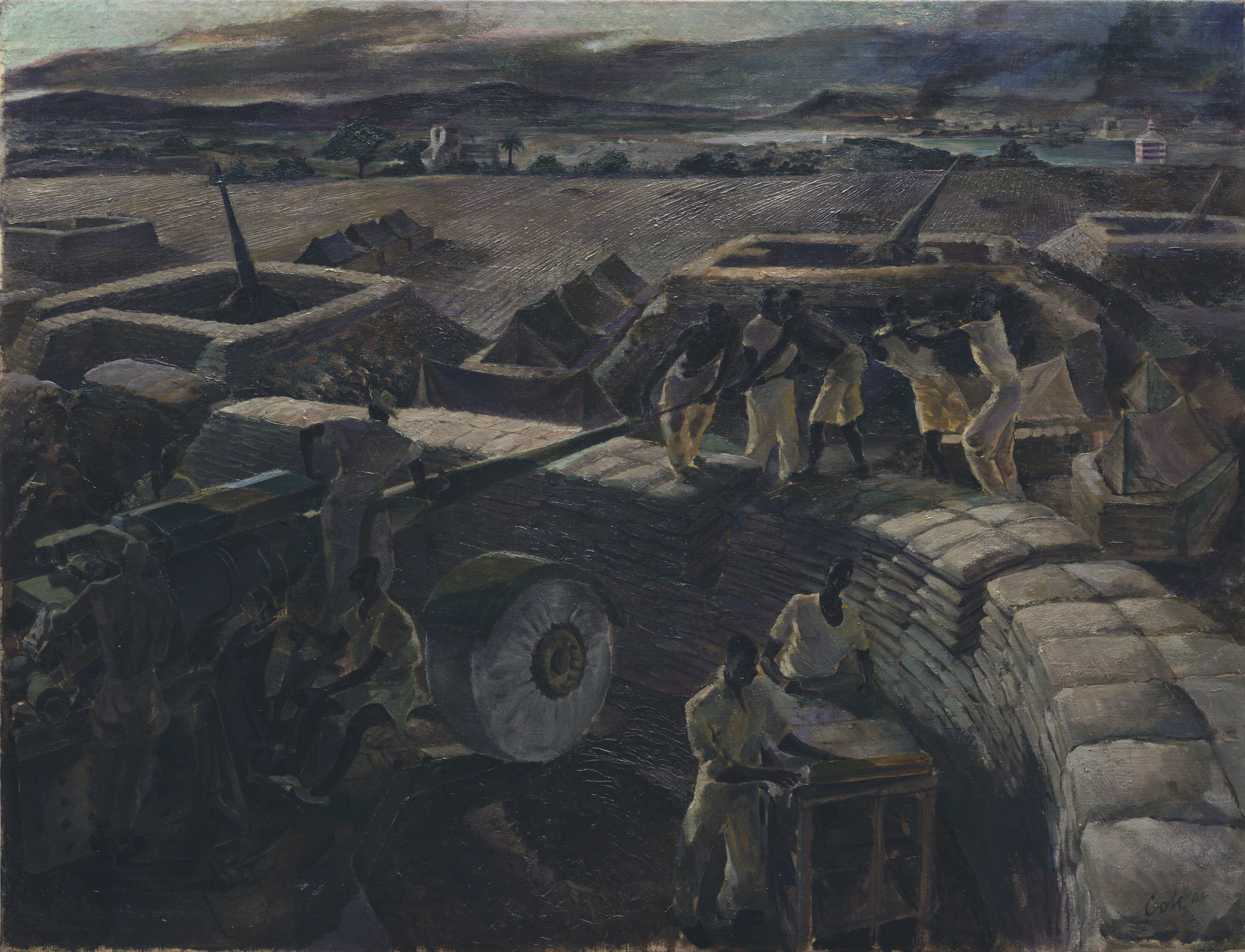
Bechuana gunners cleaning a 3.7-inch HAA gun, painting by Leslie Cole.

There were occasional engagements of high-flying single Junkers Ju 86 and Junkers Ju 88s or pairs of Bf 109s, probably on reconnaissance, but no major air raids – which was lucky, because RAF radar was unable to provide early warning and the gunners had to rely on their GL Mk II sets. 3 AAOR (later 48 AAOR) arrived in November to take over from 69th Rgt's GOR, and 1981 Bechuana Co, APC, took over the smoke defences. All the AA gun and S/L sites around the harbour were given a role in spotting mine-laying. After the disastrous Air raid on Bari in December, Lt-Col Burns laid great stress on training, blackout precautions, and improving communications and liaison, including using Italian Co-belligerent Army AA units. The first No 3 Mk II AA Radar and No 4 Mk III Local Warning Radar sets began to arrive in May 1944, but Taranto was now so far behind the front lines that only the occasional reconnaissance aircraft using a photo flash bomb was seen.

In the summer the regiment began mobile exercises, and 25 AA Bde (based at Bari) took over responsibility for Taranto as 8 AA Bde HQ moved north to be nearer the fighting. However, 69th HAA Rgt never followed. Allied Forces in Italy had an excess of AA units and the air threat to the southern Italian cities had diminished: by November the AA defences of Taranto were being run down. Meanwhile, the ground forces were suffering a manpower shortage, so a number of AA units and formations were disbanded and their personnel redistributed. 69th HAA Regiment learned on 15 December that it was to be one of these. 1975 Company APC left immediately, and the REME workshop joined the Jewish Brigade early in the new year. By the end of January all the remaining British other ranks had been sent to training depots for new roles, as field and LAA gunners, infantry, signallers, engineers, drivers or military police, and the regiment was placed in suspended animation on 20 January 1945.

== Postwar ==
When the TA was reconstituted in 1947, the regiment reformed at Birmingham as 469 (The Royal Warwickshire Regiment) Heavy Anti-Aircraft Regiment, RA. (A few months later, the Regular 5th HAA Rgt was redesignated 69th HAA Rgt.) 469 HAA Rgt formed part of 80 AA Bde (the former 54 AA Bde) at Sutton Coldfield.

When AA Command was disbanded on 10 March 1955, there was a reduction in the number of AA units in the TA. 469 HAA Rgt was amalgamated with 580 (5th Bn Royal Warwickshire Regiment) HAA Rgt, 594 (Warwickshire) LAA Rgt and 672 (Worcestershire) HAA Rgt to form 442 LAA Rgt, RA. (580 Rgt was the former 5th Royal Warwicks, and 594 Rgt was the former 59th Searchlight Rgt formed in 1938 from a cadre provided by the 5th Royal Warwicks.) The new unit, 442 LAA Rgt, was organised as follows:

- RHQ and P (5/6th Royal Warwicks) Battery at Thorp Street – from 469 and 580 Rgts
- Q (Warwickshire) Battery – from 594 Rgt
- R (Worcestershire) Battery – from 672 Rgt.

In 1961, 442 LAA Rgt was broken up: 'Q' Bty joined 268 (Warwickshire) Field Rgt, 'R' Bty joined 444 (Staffordshire) LAA Rgt. The remainder of the regiment (RHQ and P (5/6th Royal Warwicks) Bty) were absorbed by 7th Bn Royal Warwicks. This battalion had previously absorbed the 8th Bn, so the lineages of all four TA battalions of the regiment were merged.

== Honorary Colonel ==
The following served as Honorary Colonel of the battalion:

- Col C.J. Hart, CB, CBE, VD, TD (Lt-Col Commandant 7 July 1901) appointed 8 October 1909, joint Hon Col of 5th and 6th Bns
- Lt-Col E. Martineau, CMG, VD, TD, former CO, appointed 8 May 1917
- Col F.G Danielsen, CB, DSO, KStJ, TD, appointed 6 February 1929
- Col J.L. Mellor, OBE, MC, TD, appointed 6 February 1939

== Battle Honours ==
The 1st Volunteer Battalion carried the Battle Honour South Africa 1900–02 awarded for providing volunteers for the service companies in the Second Boer War. In World War I, the battalion contributed to the Honours of the Royal Warwicks. The Royal Artillery does not carry Battle Honours, so none were awarded to the regiment for its service in World War II.
