= Royal Warwickshire Regiment =

6th Regiment of Foot 6th (1st Warwickshire) Regiment of Foot 6th (Royal First Warwickshire) Regiment of Foot Royal Warwickshire Regiment Royal Warwickshire Fusiliers
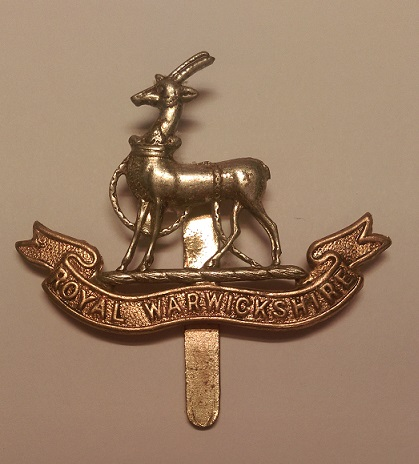
- The regimental cap badge
- Active: 1685–1968
- Country: Kingdom of England (1685–1707); Kingdom of Great Britain (1707–1800); United Kingdom (1801–1968)
- Branch: British Army
- Type: Infantry
- Role: Line infantry
- Size: 1–4 Regular battalions Up to 2 Militia battalions Up to 4 Territorial and Volunteer battalions Up to 22 Hostilities-only battalions
- Garrison/HQ: Budbrooke Barracks, Warwickshire
- Nickname: Saucy Sixth
- March: Quick: The British Grenadiers, Warwickshire Lads; Slow: MacBean's Slow March
- Mascots: Indian black buck antelope, 'Bobby'

Insignia
- Hackle (When a Fusilier Regiment): Royal Blue over old gold with a touch of Dutch pink

The Royal Warwickshire Regiment, previously titled the 6th Regiment of Foot, was a line infantry regiment of the British Army in continuous existence for 283 years. The regiment saw service in many conflicts and wars, including the Second Boer War and both the First and Second World Wars. On 1 May 1963, the regiment was re-titled, for the final time, as the Royal Warwickshire Fusiliers and became part of the Fusilier Brigade.

In 1968, by now reduced to a single Regular battalion, the regiment was amalgamated with the other regiments in the Fusilier Brigade – the Royal Northumberland Fusiliers, the Royal Fusiliers (City of London Regiment) and the Lancashire Fusiliers – into a new large infantry regiment, to be known as the Royal Regiment of Fusiliers, becoming the 2nd Battalion of the new regiment.

== History ==
=== 17th century ===
The regiment was raised in December 1673 by Sir Walter Vane, one of three 'English' units in the Dutch Anglo-Scots Brigade, a mercenary formation whose origins went back to 1586. During the 1672–1678 Franco-Dutch War, it took part in the Siege of Maastricht and the battles of Cassel and Saint-Denis. In June 1685, the brigade was sent to England in 1685 to help James II suppress the Monmouth Rebellion and returned without seeing action; while there, the unit was designated the 6th Regiment of Foot.

During the November 1688 Glorious Revolution, it accompanied William III to England in 1688; en route, a ship carrying four of its companies was captured by HMS Swallow, but the soldiers were released after James went into exile. It was transferred onto the English establishment in May 1689, although its seniority dated from 1685.

Until 1751, most regiments were considered the personal property of their Colonel and changed names when transferred. In April 1690, 'Babington's Regiment' joined the army commanded by Schomberg fighting the Jacobites in the 1689–1691 Williamite War in Ireland. Three companies were detached to garrison Charlemont Fort after its capture in May, while the rest fought at the Battle of the Boyne in July, suffering heavy casualties.

Following the battle, it was part of a detachment under Lieutenant-General James Douglas that unsuccessfully attempted to capture the Jacobite-held town of Athlone. After Babington died of disease, Prince George of Hesse-Darmstadt became the new Colonel in January 1691; he commanded the regiment at Aughrim, and the Second Siege of Limerick in August 1691 that ended the war in Ireland.

Sent to Flanders in 1692, it was one of five British regiments almost wiped out at the Battle of Steenkerque in July and was out of action for over a year. In 1694, Prince George was replaced as Colonel by the French Huguenot exile Henri Nompar de Caumont, Marquis de Rade, who died of wounds received in a duel with Bevil Granville in June 1695. Under its new Colonel Ventris Columbine, the regiment won its first battle honour for the 1695 Siege of Namur.

The Treaty of Ryswick ended the Nine Years War in 1697; Parliament was determined to reduce costs and by 1699, the English military was less than 7,000 men. Since England, Ireland and Scotland each had their own Parliaments and funding, one way around this was to transfer regiments and the regiment appears on the Irish military establishment for December 1698.

=== 18th century ===
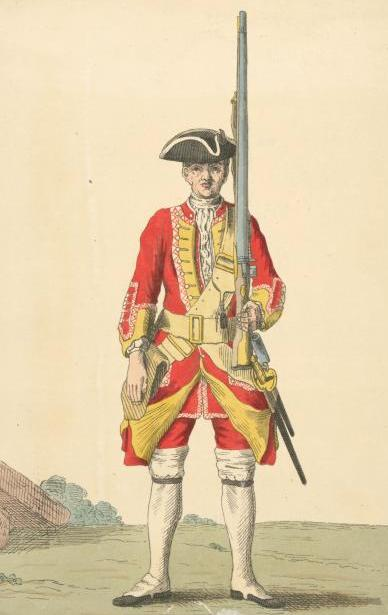
c. 1742 engraving of a regimental private

When the War of the Spanish Succession began, the regiment took part in the 1702 Cádiz Landing; in 1703, it was sent to the West Indies, a notoriously unhealthy posting in an expedition that achieved very little. Colonel Columbine died in June 1703, shortly before reaching Jamaica and was replaced by James Rivers.

The rest of the war was spent campaigning in Spain and Portugal, including Almansa in 1707 and the 1708 capture of Minorca. In 1710, it fought at Almenar and Saragossa before being surrounded and captured at Brihuega. After the 1713 Treaty of Utrecht, it was posted to Ireland and with the exception of the 1719 Vigo expedition, remained there until 1740.

In 1739, commercial tensions with Spain led to the War of Jenkins' Ear; in January 1741, the unit returned to the West Indies and took part in the expedition to Cartagena de Indias, modern Colombia. The expeditionary force suffered losses of between 80 and 90% from dysentery and yellow fever. The survivors returned to England in December 1742; the unit was brought up to strength as a result of the 1740–1748 War of the Austrian Succession, then sent to Scotland.

At the beginning of the Jacobite Rising in July 1745, detachments from the regiment garrisoned the line of forts between Inverness and Fort William. Two companies were captured at the Battle of Prestonpans; some changed sides and were executed as deserters in 1746. Several companies defended Fort William in March 1746 and after Culloden, took part in the pacification of the Highlands.

The regiment remained in Scotland until 1753; it was transferred to Gibraltar, where it spent the next 19 years before moving to the West Indies in 1772. On the outbreak of the American War of Independence, detachments from the 6th arrived in New York in 1776 and saw action, but were of insufficient strength and were sent home. To aid recruiting, each infantry unit was linked with a county in 1782 and the 6th became the 6th (1st Warwickshire) Regiment. During the French Revolutionary Wars in 1794 in the West Indies, the 6th took part in the invasions of Martinique, Guadeloupe and Saint Lucia from the French and in Castlebar, in August 1798, it gained a battle honour being one of the last regiments to give ground (together with the Fraser Fencibles) whilst its commanding officer, Major Macbean, was taken prisoner by the French and very cruelly treated.

=== 19th century ===
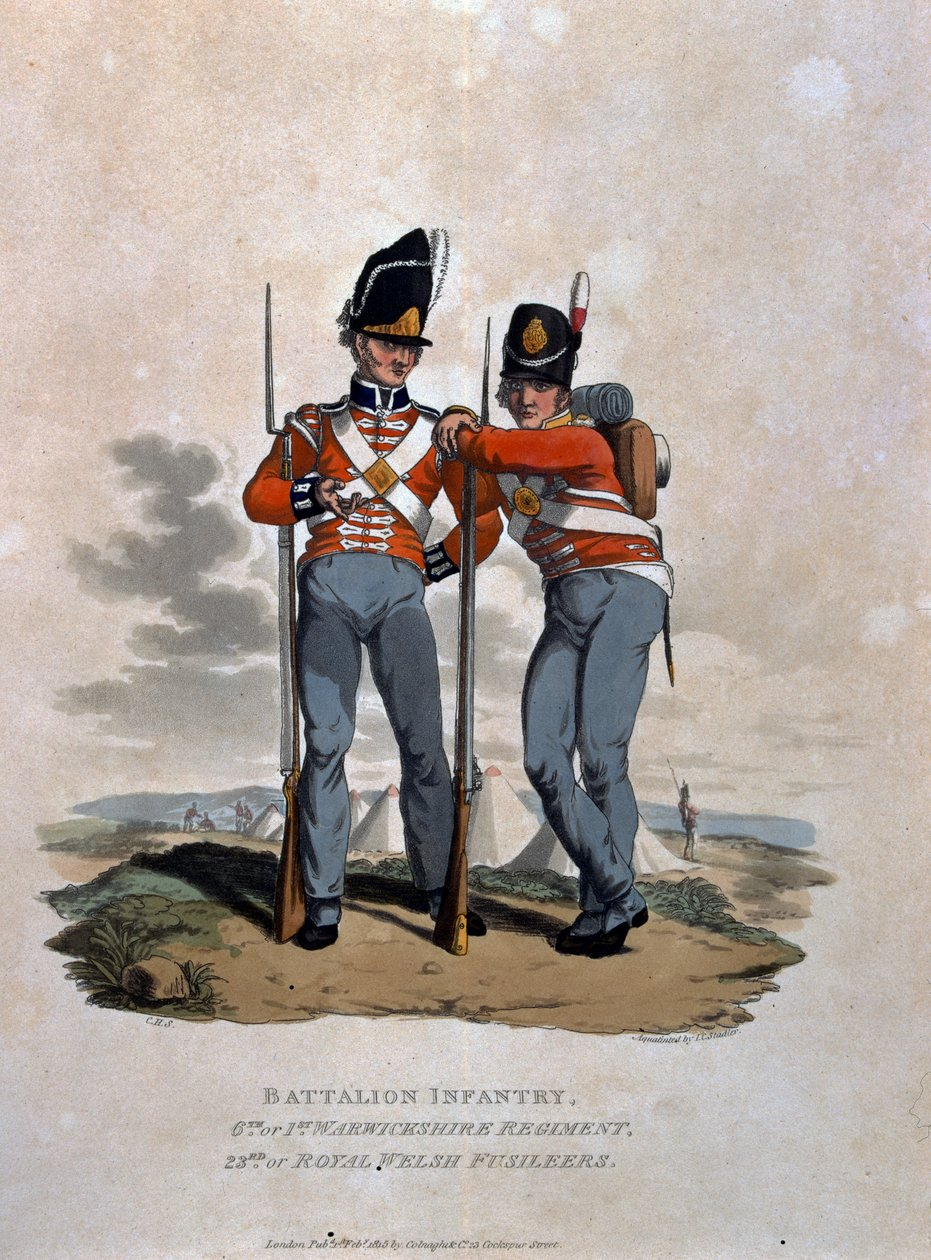
1815 engraving of a regimental grenadier (left)

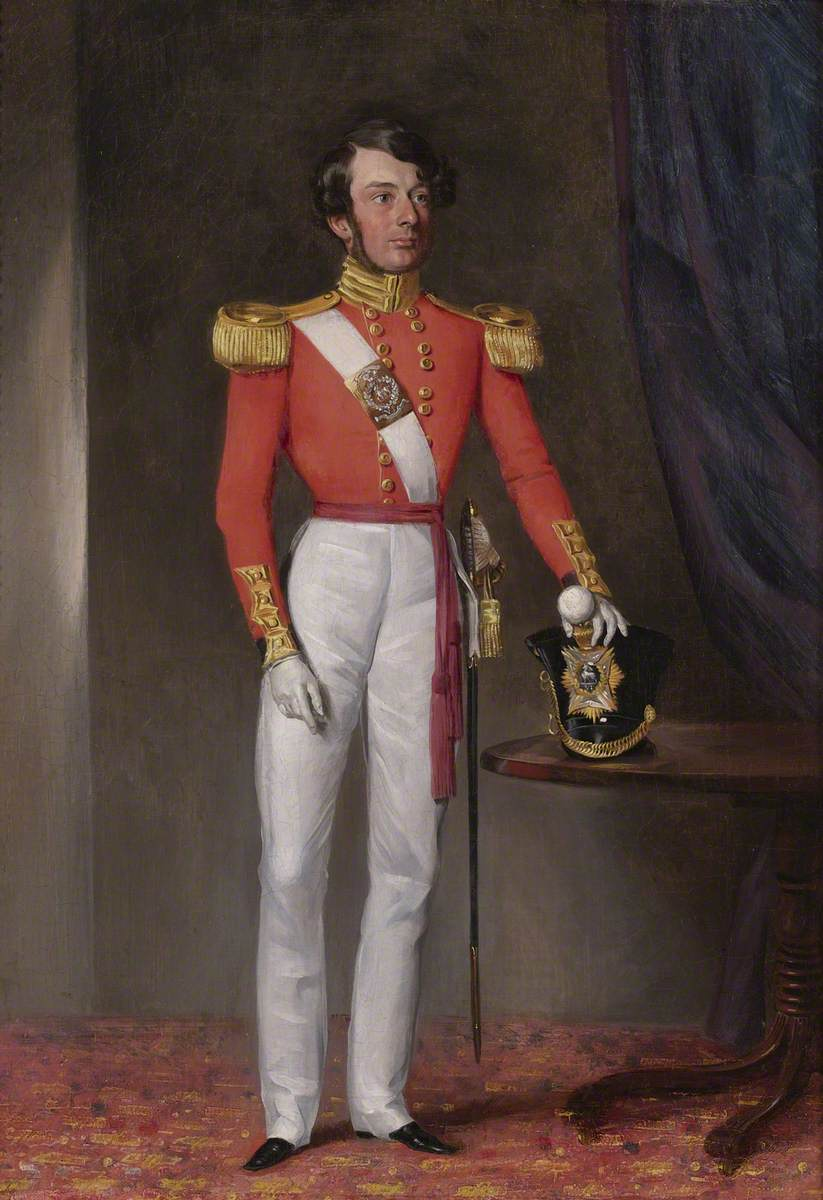
c. 1843 painting of a regimental officer

The 1st Battalion went from Gibraltar to the Iberian Peninsula and was at Roliça and Vimeiro in 1808. The battalion took part in the Corunna, losing 400 men during the march. The men were then shipped to UK before taking part in the Walcheren Campaign before returning to the Peninsula in 1812. The regiment was present at Vitoria in 1813 and heavily engaged at the later action at Roncesvalles. At the Heights of Echalar, in August 1813, Wellington watched the regiment's attack against 6,000 French in rugged positions in the mountains and described it as "The most gallant and the finest thing he had ever witnessed". The regiment was held in reserve at the Nive and was again heavily engaged at Orthez in 1814.

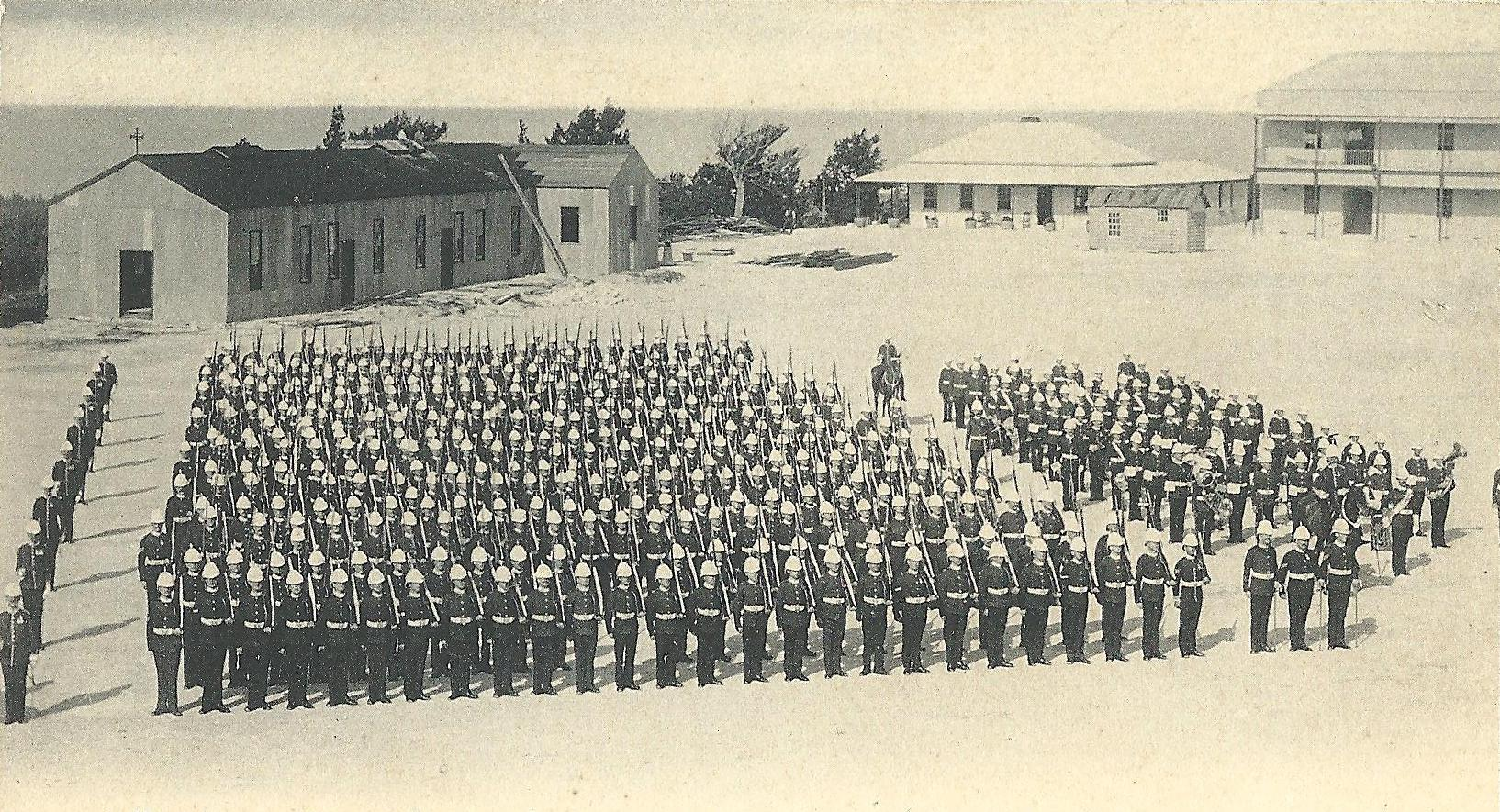
The regiment's 3rd Battalion on parade at Prospect Camp, Bermuda, c. 1902

In 1832, the 6th became a Royal Regiment and its title was changed to the Royal (1st) Warwickshire Regiment. The 6th took part in the 7th and 8th Xhosa Wars in South Africa and helped suppress the Indian Rebellion in 1857.

The regiment was not fundamentally affected by the Cardwell Reforms of the 1870s, which gave it a depot at Budbrooke Barracks in Warwickshire from 1873, or by the Childers reforms of 1881; since it already possessed two battalions, there was no need for it to amalgamate with another regiment. Under the reforms, the regiment became the Royal Warwickshire Regiment on 1 July 1881 and became the county regiment for Warwickshire (at the time including Birmingham) and encompassed its Militia and Volunteer Infantry. Under these reforms, the regiment now consisted of the following battalions:

Regulars

- 1st Battalion in 1881 based in London
- 2nd Battalion in 1881 based in Jubbulpore

Militia

- 3rd (Militia) Battalion, based in Warwick, formerly the 1st Warwick Militia
- 4th (Militia) Battalion, based in Warwick, formerly the 2nd Warwick Militia

Volunteer Infantry

- [Double-battalion] 1st & 2nd Battalions, 1st (Birmingham) Warwickshire Rifle Volunteer Corps, based in Birmingham, renamed as 1st Volunteer Battalion in 1883
- [Double-battalion] 1st & 2nd Battalions, 2nd Warwickshire Rifle Volunteer Corps, based in Coventry, renamed as 2nd Volunteer Battalion in 1883

In 1898, the regiment fought at Atbara and Omdurman during Lord Kitchener's reconquest of the Sudan and saw service at Diamond Hill and Bergendal during the Second Boer War.

=== 20th century ===
The 2nd battalion started the century in South Africa, where they were engaged in heavy fighting in the early phases of the Second Boer War. After a large portion of the men were struck down with malarial fever, they were in August 1901 transferred to Bermuda to guard Boer prisoners. The battalion returned home in November 1902, after the end of the war earlier that year, to be stationed at Raglan barracks, Devonport, Plymouth.

The 5th (Militia) battalion, formed from the 1st Warwick Militia in 1881, was a reserve battalion. It was embodied in January 1900, disembodied in October that year, and later re-embodied for service in South Africa during the Second Boer War. Almost 700 officers and men returned to Southampton on the SS Briton in September 1902, following the end of the war.

In 1908, Secretary of State for War Richard Haldane implemented a series of reforms, which merged the Volunteer Force and Yeomanry into the larger Territorial Force. After these reforms, the regiment was now organised as follows:

Regulars

- 1st Battalion in 1908 based in Peshawar
- 2nd Battalion in 1908 based at Bordon Camp

Special Reserve

- 3rd (Special Reserve) Battalion based in Warwick, formerly 3rd Militia Btn
- 4th (Extra Reserve) Battalion based in Warwick, formerly 4th Militia Btn

Territorial Force

- 5th Battalion HQ based at the Thorp Street drill hall, Birmingham, formerly 1st Btn, 1st Volunteer Btn
- 6th Battalion HQ based at the Thorp Street drill hall, Birmingham, formerly 2nd Btn, 1st Volunteer Btn
- 7th Battalion HQ based at Queen Victoria Road Drill Hall, Coventry, formerly 1st & 2nd Btns, 2nd Volunteer Btn
- 8th Battalion HQ based at Aston Lower Grounds, Aston, new formed in 1908

Cadet Affiliations

- 1st Cadet Battalion based at The Barracks, Aston Manor, affiliated to 8th Btn
- 2nd Cadet Battalion based at Stevens Memorial Hall, Coventry, affiliated to 7th Btn
- 3rd Cadet Battalion based at Thorp Street drill hall, Birmingham, affiliated to 5th Btn
- 4th (Schools) Cadet Battalion based at 15 & 16 Exchange Buildings, Birmingham, affiliated to 6th Btn

In 1908, the Volunteers and Militia were reorganised nationally, with the former becoming the Territorial Force and the latter the Special Reserve; the regiment now had two Reserve and four Territorial battalions.

==== First World War ====
===== Regular Army =====
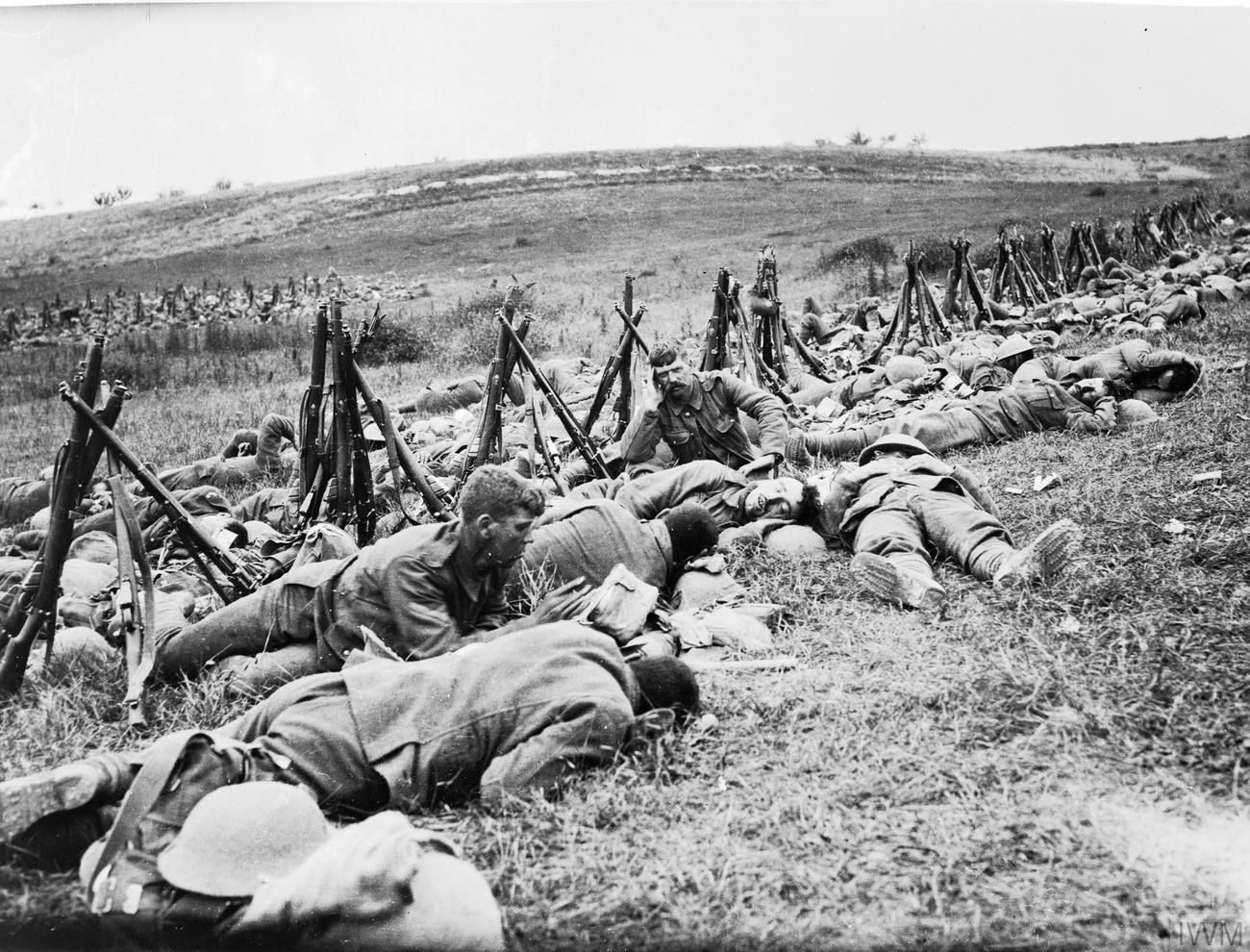
Men of the Royal Warwickshire Regiment resting during the Battle of the Somme 1916

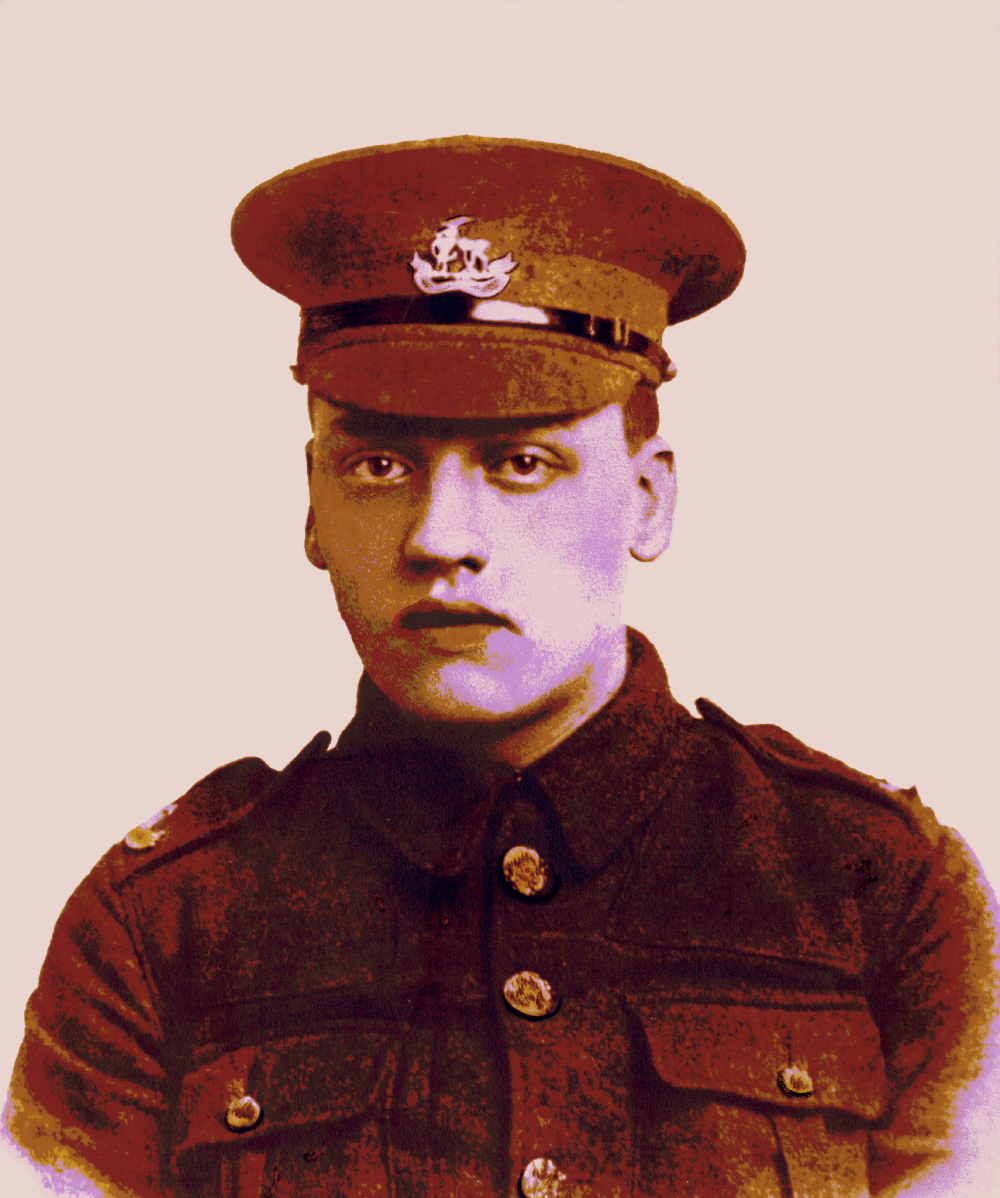
Private John Brettle in Royal Warwickshire Regiment Uniform 1918

The 1st Battalion landed in France as part of the 10th Brigade in the 4th Division in August 1914 for service on the Western Front. Bernard Montgomery served with the battalion seeing action at the Battle of Le Cateau and during the retreat from Mons in August 1914 and was awarded the Distinguished Service Order at that time.

The 2nd Battalion landed at Zeebrugge as part of the 22nd Brigade in the 7th Division in October 1914 for service on the Western Front and then moved to Italy in November 1917.

Second Lieutenant Euan Lucie-Smith, who was commissioned into the 1st Battalion, was one of the first mixed-heritage infantry officers in a regular British Army regiment and, on 25 April 1915, the first killed in World War I.

===== Territorial Force =====
Men of the Royal Warwickshire Regiment (143rd Brigade, 48th Division) having a clean up by the roadside, possibly in Italy, December 1917.

The 1/5th, 1/6th, 1/7th and 1/8th battalions landed at Le Havre as part of Warwickshire Brigade in the South Midland Division in March 1915 for service on the Western Front and then moved to Italy in November 1917.

The 2/5th, 2/6th, 2/7th and 2/8th battalions landed in France as part of the 182nd (2nd Warwickshire) Brigade in the 61st (2nd South Midland) Division in May 1916 for service on the Western Front.

===== New Armies =====
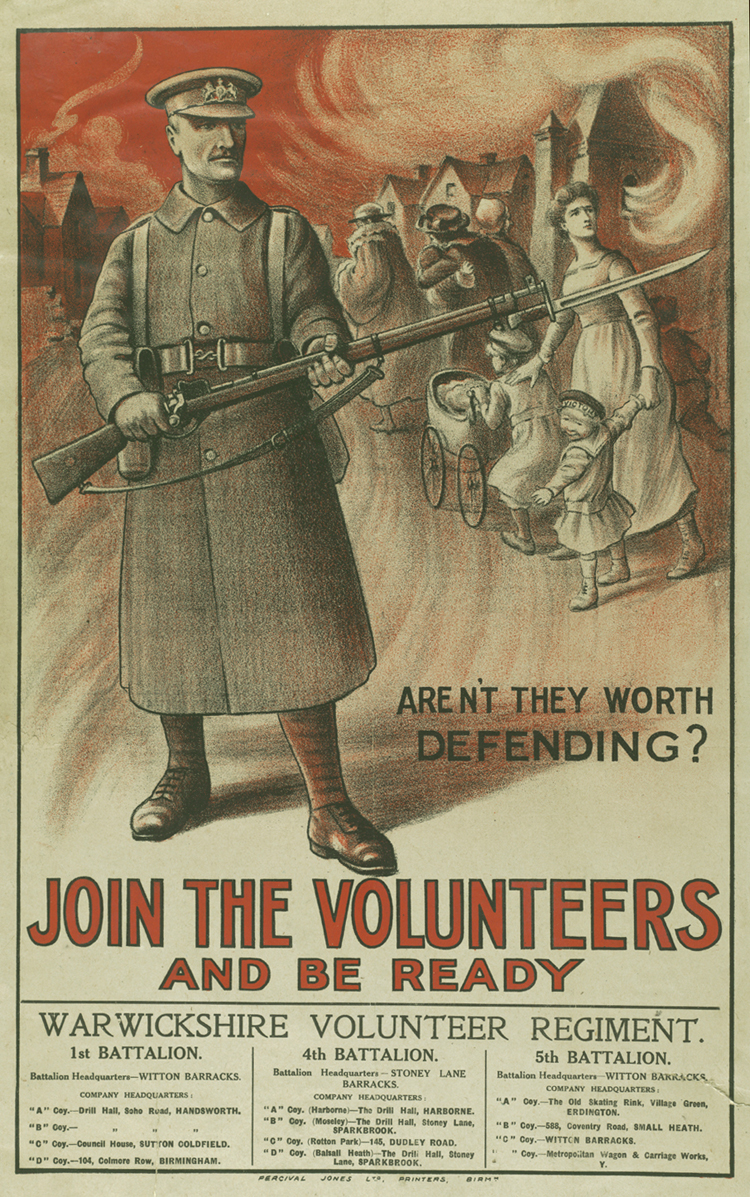
World War I recruiting poster for the Warwickshire Regiment

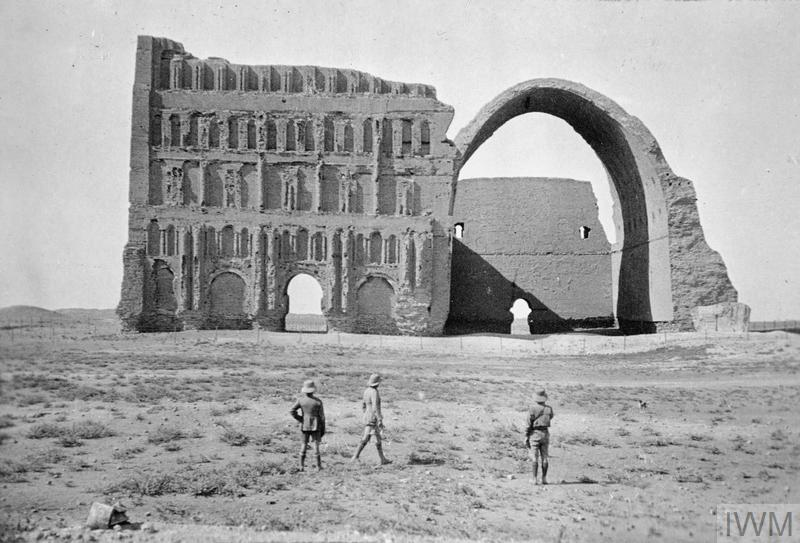
Men of the 9th Battalion stand before the ruins of the Taq Kasra in Ctesiphon, Mesopotamia in March 1917

The 9th (Service) Battalion landed in Gallipoli as part of the 39th Brigade in the 13th (Western) Division in July 1915; the battalion was evacuated to Egypt in January 1916 and then moved to Mesopotamia in February 1916. Elements of the 39th brigade formed Dunsterforce which fought against the Ottoman Empire at the Battle of Baku in August 1918. William Slim served with the battalion and was awarded the Military Cross in February 1918 for actions in Mesopotamia.

The 10th (Service) Battalion landed in France as part of the 57th Brigade in the 19th (Western) Division in July 1915 for service on the Western Front.

The 11th (Service) Battalion landed in France as part of the 112th Brigade in the 37th Division in July 1915 for service on the Western Front.

The 14th, 15th and 16th (Service) battalions, were raised in September 1914 from men volunteering in Birmingham. These units were additionally entitled 1st, 2nd and 3rd City of Birmingham battalions and were known as the Birmingham Pals. They landed at Boulogne-sur-Mer as part of the 95th Brigade in the 32nd Division in November 1915 for service on the Western Front; they then moved to Italy in November 1917 and back to France in April 1918.

==== Second World War ====
===== Regular Army battalions =====
The 1st Battalion of the regiment had served from 1937 to 1939 on the North West Frontier in British India. Throughout the war, the 1st Battalion remained mainly on garrison duties and internal security operations, despite many times being promised a chance to fight in the war. In late 1944, it began training for jungle warfare. The battalion only very briefly fought in the final stages of the Burma Campaign under Lieutenant-General Bill Slim, an officer who served with the regiment during the Great War and who led the British Fourteenth Army and took part in Operation Dracula, the capture of Rangoon, with the 4th Indian Infantry Brigade, part of the 26th Indian Infantry Division, in April 1945 but saw little contact with the enemy and, on 20 May, the battalion received orders to prepare to, again, return to India. On the 23rd, Major J.A. Collins, Officer Commanding 'A' Company, led his company against a group of between to 50 and 100 of the enemy, in Tinzeik, and inflicted heavy casualties on them before withdrawing into the jungle. For this action, Major Collins was awarded the Military Cross for his leadership, along with Lance Corporal Brooks the Military Medal, and Private McCullum a mention in despatches and the 1st Battalion "earned the commendation of the Division Commander, Major-General Chambers." 'A' Company then rejoined the rest of the battalion in Rangoon, which departed on the 20th, and then moved to Bangalore.

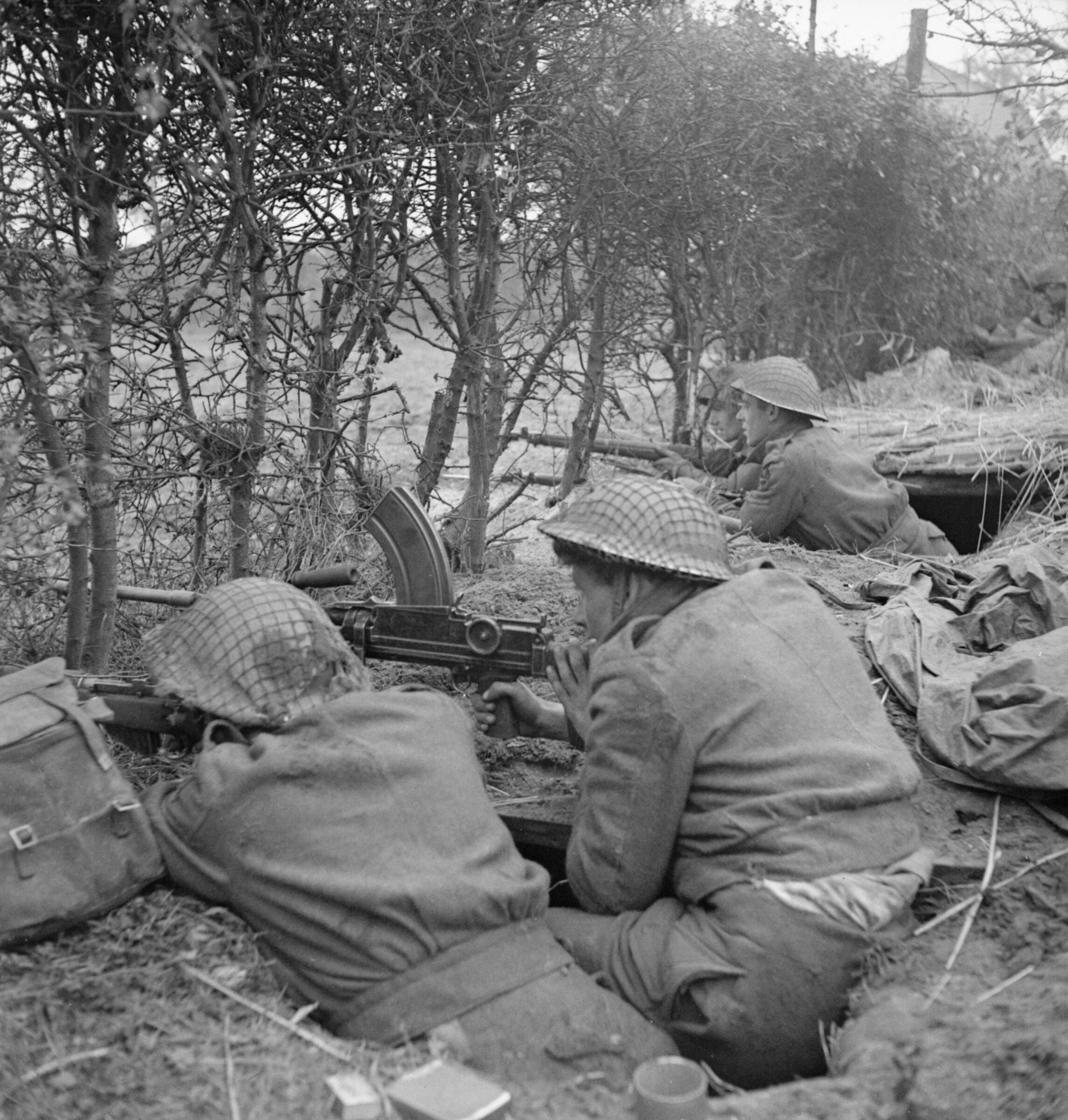
Troops of the 2nd Battalion, Royal Warwickshire Regiment dug in with a Bren gun along a hedge near Venray, the Netherlands, 17 October 1944.

The 2nd Battalion, Royal Warwickshire Regiment, a Regular Army unit, had been serving in England since 1931 and, upon the outbreak of the Second World War, was serving alongside the 2nd Battalion, Dorset Regiment and the 1st Battalion, Queen's Own Cameron Highlanders in the 5th Infantry Brigade, part of the 2nd Infantry Division. In late September 1939, the battalion was sent overseas to France to join the British Expeditionary Force (BEF) on the Franco-Belgian border, where it remained for many months, not involved in any major engagements. On 5 February 1940, due to official BEF policy, the battalion was exchanged in the brigade for the 7th Battalion, Worcestershire Regiment and transferred to the 144th Infantry Brigade, which was attached to the 48th (South Midland) Infantry Division, a Territorial division. Serving in the brigade alongside the 2nd Battalion were the 8th Battalion, Worcestershires and the 5th Battalion, Gloucestershire Regiment. The battalion, now under command of Lieutenant Colonel Philip Hicks (an officer of the regiment who would serve with distinction in the war), fought in the Battle of France in May 1940, fighting at the defence of the Escaut and Wormhoudt, where they became embroiled in the Wormhoudt massacre and fought on the Ypres-Comines Canal during the retreat to Dunkirk, from where they were evacuated to England, most of the remaining men arriving on 1 June 1940. After Dunkirk, the battalion moved, with the rest of the brigade and division, to Somerset to counter a German invasion. In early December, however, the battalion was transferred to the 24th Independent Guards Brigade Group, alongside two battalions of Foot Guards, the 1st Scots Guards and the 1st Welsh Guards, and was not, unlike most of the rest of the Army, committed to beach defence duties. At the time, the brigade was stationed in London under command of London District. In September 1942, the battalion was transferred to the 185th Infantry Brigade, which was originally assigned as the motorised infantry brigade of the 79th Armoured Division. However, the brigade was then transferred to the 3rd Infantry Division, and landed on D-Day on 6 June 1944 with the first assault on the Normandy beaches and fought from the Battle for Caen and the break out from Normandy to the Rhine crossing. The brigade also took part in the capture of Bremen, the last major action of the North West Europe Campaign. From D-Day until the end of the war, the 2nd Battalion, Royal Warwickshire Regiment lost 286 officers and men killed in action, with nearly another 1,000 all ranks wounded, missing or suffering from exhaustion.

===== Territorial Army battalions =====
Before the war, in 1936, the 5th Battalion had been converted into the 45th (The Royal Warwickshire Regiment) Anti-Aircraft Battalion, Royal Engineers and had become part of 32nd (South Midland) Anti-Aircraft Group, 2nd Anti-Aircraft Division. It transferred to the Royal Artillery in 1940 and later became a Light Anti-Aircraft unit and then an Anti-Tank regiment that saw action in the Burma Campaign, as part of 36th Indian Infantry Division.

Like the 5th Battalion, the 6th Battalion was also converted before the war, becoming the 69th (The Royal Warwickshire Regiment) Anti-Aircraft Brigade, Royal Artillery, transferring to the 32nd (South Midland) Anti-Aircraft Group, 2nd Anti-Aircraft Division, alongside the former 5th Battalion.

The 1/7th Battalion was serving with the 8th Battalion in the 143rd Infantry Brigade, both as part of the 48th (South Midland) Infantry Division. The battalion departed for France in early 1940 to join the rest of the BEF. The 1/7th took part in heavy fighting along the Ypres–Comines Canal holding the sector south of Houthem Belgium between 26 May 1940 and 28 May 1940: the heavy fighting between these dates allowed British forces to retreat towards Dunkirk. Like the 2nd Battalion, the 1/7th was also driven back to Dunkirk, with the 1/7th having been reduced to 15 officers and 200 other ranks. In October 1942, the battalion was transferred from the 48th Division to the 197th Infantry Brigade, serving now alongside the 2/5th Lancashire Fusiliers and 5th East Lancashire Regiment, part of the 59th (Staffordshire) Infantry Division, at the time serving in Northern Ireland. The battalion served with the 59th in France during Operation Overlord, the Battle of Normandy, arriving in late June 1944 as part of the British Second Army. The 59th Division was considered by General Bernard Montgomery, an officer who served in the regiment throughout the Great War and after, to be one of the best and most reliable divisions in his 21st Army Group. However, the division was disbanded in late August 1944 due to an acute shortage of infantrymen in the British Army during that period and the units were broken up and used as replacements for other British divisions in 21st Army Group, as many had suffered heavy casualties. The reason Montgomery chose the 59th for disbandment was merely because it was the most junior division of the British Army in France, being a 2nd Line duplicate of the 55th (West Lancashire) Infantry Division formed just before the war began. Despite being overseas for only around five weeks, the battalion had suffered losses of 38 officers and 538 other ranks.

The 8th Battalion was also a 1st Line Territorial battalion and served with both the 2nd and 1/7th battalions in France in 1940. After being evacuated at Dunkirk, during which it was reduced to 8 officers and 134 other ranks, the battalion spent many years on home defence anticipating a German invasion and remained in the United Kingdom for the rest of the war. In 1944, the battalion became a training formation and a draft finding unit for forces deployed overseas. In this capacity, it served initially with the 80th Infantry (Reserve) Division and later the 38th Infantry (Reserve) Division.

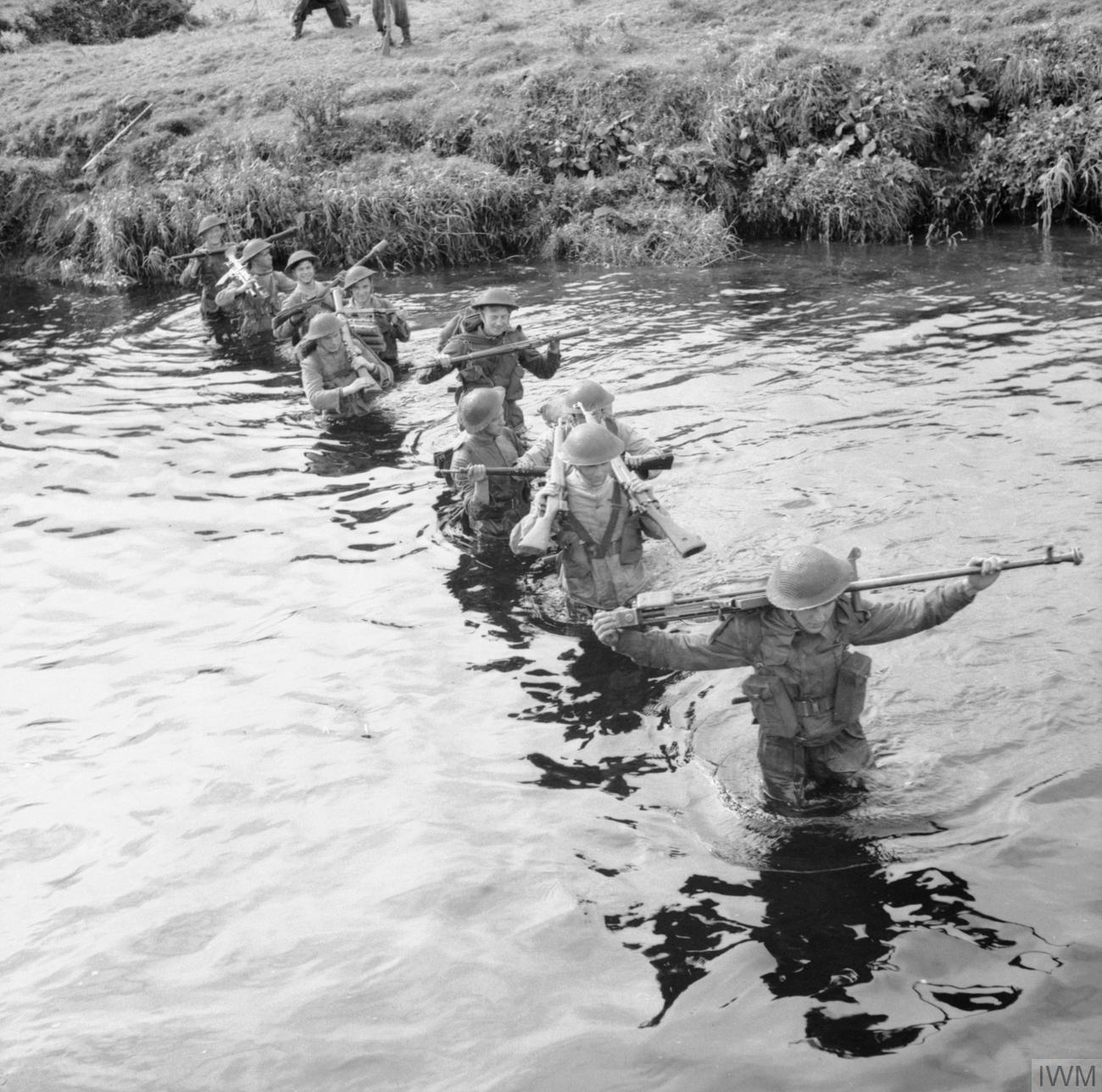
Infantrymen of the 9th Battalion, Royal Warwickshire Regiment, wading across a stream, Northern Ireland, 11 September 1942. The leading man is carrying a Boys anti-tank rifle.

The 2/7th and 9th Battalions, both formed in mid-1939 during the doubling of the Territorial Army, were raised as duplicates of the 1/7th and 8th battalions, respectively. Both battalions were assigned to the 182nd Infantry Brigade, 61st Infantry Division. However, both remained in the United Kingdom throughout the war, both briefly serving in Northern Ireland until being reduced to reserve training battalions, with the 9th being disbanded in late 1944.

===== Hostilities-only battalions =====
The 12th (Garrison) Battalion was created in November 1939 and formally came into existence on 18 January 1940 at Newton Abbot in Devonshire. Formed mainly from ex-servicemen around the age of 35–50, its role was overseas garrison duties in the rear areas guarding important areas and line of communications. In March 1940, the battalion was sent to France, fulfilling its job of guarding the rear echelons, until ordered to evacuate, with the rest of the BEF, and was evacuated from Brest and St. Malo on 16/17 June 1940, without a single casualty. When the battalion returned to the United Kingdom, it followed the usual pattern that consumed the British Army after Dunkirk, mainly guarding against an invasion, which it continued to do so until 19 February 1942, when its other ranks personnel formed 182nd Field Regiment, Royal Artillery; the 12th Battalion was formally disbanded on 19 March 1942. 1n 1943 182nd Field Rgt was assigned to 38th (Welsh) Infantry Division; it was disbanded in December 1944.

The 13th Battalion, Royal Warwickshire Regiment was formed in July 1940. Later in the year, the battalion became part of the 213th Independent Infantry Brigade (Home), later becoming part of the Norfolk County Division. The battalion was converted in late 1942 to become a battalion of the newly formed Parachute Regiment, namely the 8th (Midlands) Parachute Battalion, and also included numerous volunteers from other battalions of the regiment, such as the 70th. It was assigned to the 3rd Parachute Brigade, serving alongside the 1st Canadian Parachute Battalion and the 9th (Eastern and Home Counties) Parachute Battalion, originally as part of the 1st Airborne Division, but were later assigned to the newly raised 6th Airborne Division. As well as being assigned to a new division, the battalion also received a new commanding officer – Lieutenant Colonel Alastair Pearson – who would eventually rise to become one of the most highly respected and decorated soldiers in the history of the Parachute Regiment. The 8th Parachute Battalion would participate in Operation Tonga, the British airborne drop on the night before D-Day, and throughout the Normandy Campaign, the Ardennes offensive (otherwise known as the Battle of the Bulge), and Operation Varsity, the largest airborne drop of the Second World War where the division, alongside the U.S. 17th Airborne Division, suffered heavy casualties. The battalion ended the war in Germany.

The 50th (Holding) Battalion was formed in May 1940, during the time of the Dunkirk evacuation, and had the job of holding and training new recruits as well as to defend the coastline against invasion. At the end of the year, it was converted into a standard infantry battalion and was redesignated as the 14th Battalion, and became part of the 226th Independent Infantry Brigade (Home), later becoming part of the Dorset County Division. Throughout 1941 and 1942, the battalion was stationed in Dorset, later Devonshire and eventually became part of the 211th Independent Infantry Brigade (Home), at the time part of the 77th Infantry Division.

The 70th (Young Soldiers) Battalion was raised in late December 1940/early 1941 from volunteers who were mainly around the ages of 18 and 19 and, therefore, too young to be conscripted, the age of conscription being 20 at the time. Sometime after its birth, the battalion joined the 47th (London) Infantry Division, where it "soon won an excellent reputation (it was said to be the best Young Soldiers' battalion in the country)". The battalion remained in the United Kingdom throughout the war and was disbanded in August 1943, as were all such units.

==== Post war years ====
The 1st Battalion was deployed to India between 1945 and 1947, and then to Korea between 1953 and 1954 during the Korean War. It served in Cyprus between 1955 and 1959, and then was based in Aden from 1959 to 1960. In 1961 it was deployed in Hong Kong, and it was then in Germany from 1962 to 1965. Meanwhile, the 2nd Battalion was in Palestine from 1945 to 1948.

In 1958, the depot in Warwick was closed and the regiment was reduced to a single regular battalion, sharing a depot in Strensall with the three other regiments of the Midland Brigade (renamed the Forester Brigade in 1958). In November 1962, it was announced that the Forester Brigade was to be broken up and the Royal Warwickshire Regiment was promptly transferred to the Fusilier Brigade.

In February 1963, it was announced that the Queen had approved of the regiment becoming fusiliers and adopting the title of Royal Warwickshire Fusiliers from 1 May 1963. As a fusilier regiment, the Royal Warwicks were entitled to wear a coloured feather hackle in the headdress. The colours chosen by the regiment were royal blue over orange (described as "old gold with a touch of Dutch pink"). The colours were those of the Royal House of Nassau, recalling the regiment's Dutch origins.

On 23 April 1968, the four regiments of the Fusilier Brigade were amalgamated to become a large regiment as the Royal Regiment of Fusiliers.

== Memorial at Lébisey ==
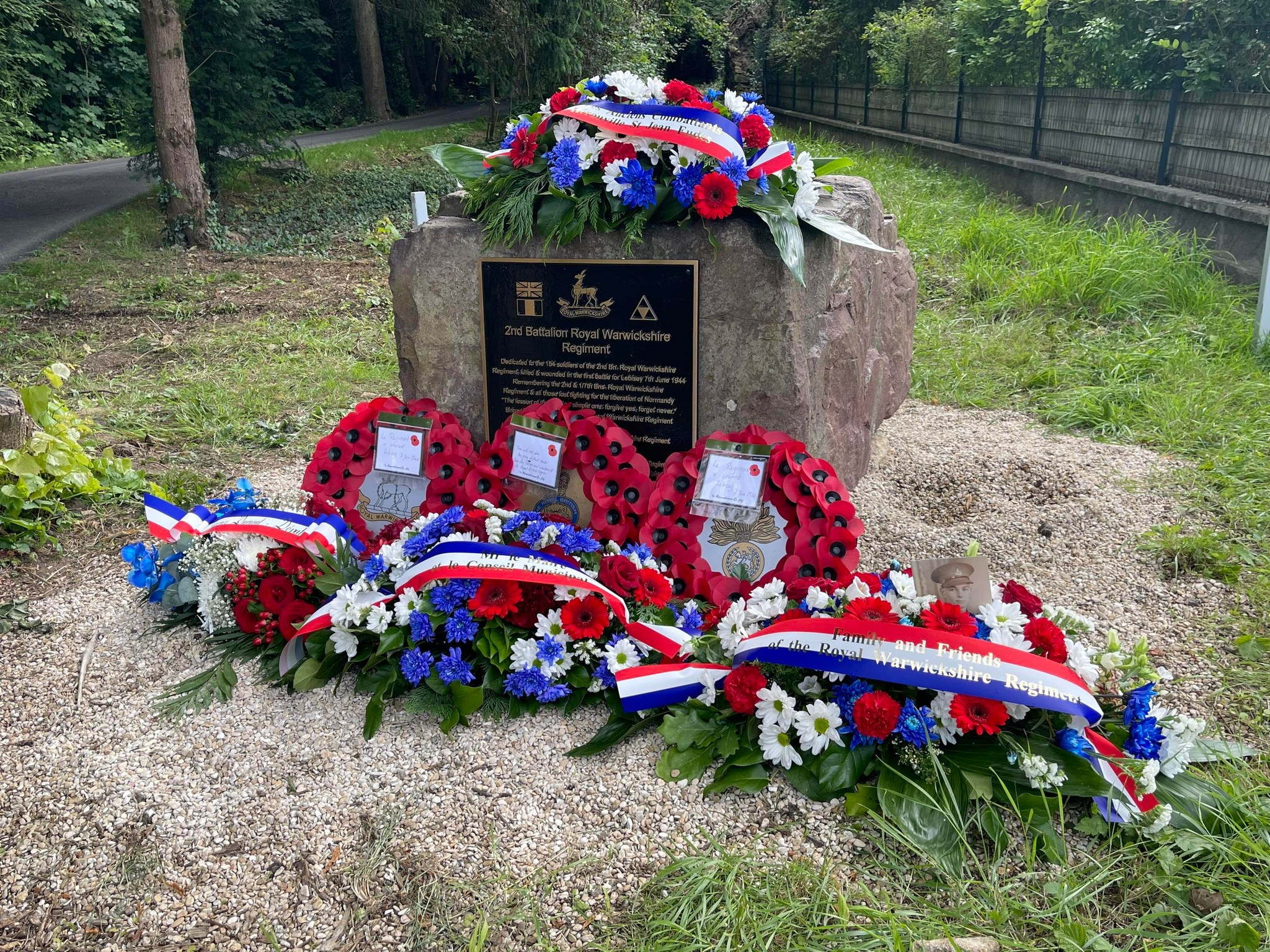
Memorial at Lébisey

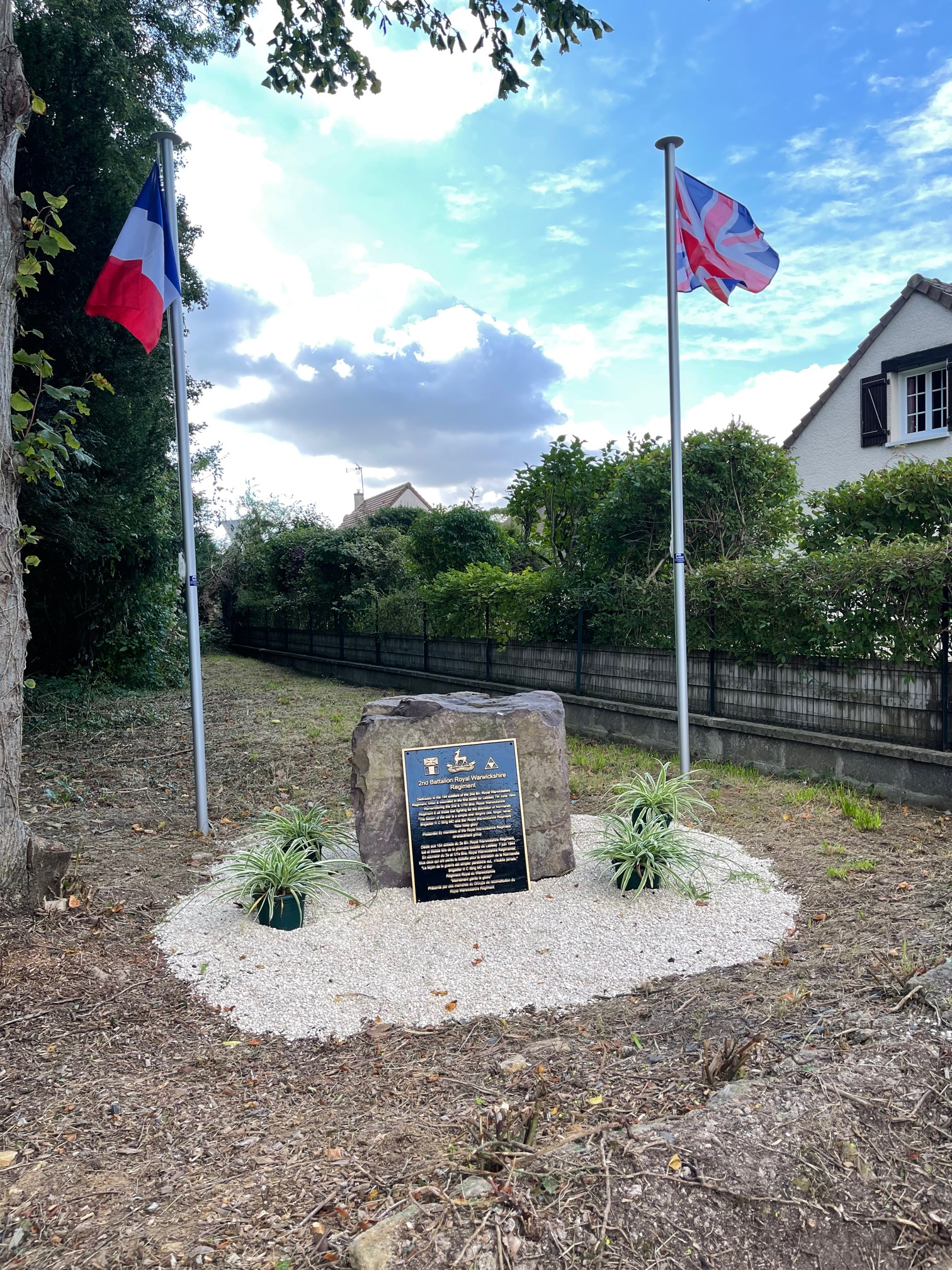
Memorial at Lébisey

A memorial at Lébisey in Normandy, on the site of the first battle for Lébisey in 1944, was officially unveiled on 7 June 2022.

== Regimental museum ==
The Royal Regiment of Fusiliers Museum (Royal Warwickshire) is based at Pageant House in Jury Street, Warwick.

== Battle honours ==
The regiment's battle honours were as follows:

- Namur 1695, Martinique 1794, Rolica, Vimiera, Corunna, Vittoria, Pyrenees, Nivelle, Orthes, Peninsula, Niagara, South Africa 1846–47, 1851–53, Atbara, Khartoum, South Africa 1899–1902
- The Great War (30 battalions): Le Cateau, Retreat from Mons, Marne 1914, Aisne 1914 '18, Armentières 1914, Ypres 1914 '15 '17, Langemarck 1914 '17, Gheluvelt, Neuve Chapelle, St. Julien, Frezenberg, Bellewaarde, Aubers, Festubert 1915, Loos, Somme 1916 '18, Albert 1916 '18, Bazentin, Delville Wood, Pozières, Guillemont, Flers-Courcelette, Morval, Le Transloy, Ancre Heights, Ancre 1916, Arras 1917 '18, Vimy 1917, Scarpe 1917 '18, Arleux, Oppy, Bullecourt, Messines 1917 '18, Pilckem, Menin Road, Polygon Wood, Broodseinde, Poelcappelle, Passchendaele, Cambrai 1917 '18, St. Quentin, Bapaume 1918, Rosières, Lys, Estaires, Hazebrouck, Bailleul, Kemmel, Béthune, Drocourt Quéant, Hindenburg Line, Épéhy, Canal du Nord, Beaurevoir, Selle, Valenciennes, Sambre, France and Flanders 1914–18, Piave, Vittorio Veneto, Italy 1917–18, Suvla, Sari Bair, Gallipoli 1915–16, Tigris 1916, Kut al Amara 1917, Baghdad, Mesopotamia 1916–18, Baku, Persia 1918
- The Second World War: Defence of Escaut, Wormhoudt, Ypres-Comines Canal, Normandy Landing, Caen, Bourguébus Ridge, Mont Pincon, Falaise, Venraij, Rhineland, Lingen, Brinkum, Bremen, North-West Europe 1940 '44–45, Burma 1945

== Victoria Crosses ==
The following members of the regiment were awarded the Victoria Cross:

- Lance-Corporal (later Corporal) William Amey, Great War
- Temporary Lieutenant (later Captain) Robert Edwin Phillips, Great War
- Private (later Sergeant) Arthur Vickers, Great War
- Temporary Captain Julian Royds Gribble, Great War
- Private (later Corporal) Arthur Hutt, Great War
- Lieutenant Colonel Edward Elers Delaval Henderson (detached from the North Staffordshire Regiment), Great War

== Colonels of the Regiment ==
The colonels of the regiment have been:

- 1673–1674: Maj-Gen. Sir Walter Vane (killed at Battle of Seneffe, 1674)
- 1674–1675: Brig-Gen. Luke Lillingston
- 1675–1678: Col. Thomas Ashley;
- 1678–1688: Lt-Gen. Sir Henry Belasyse;
- 1688–1691: Col. Philip Babington;
- 1691–1694: Maj-Gen. Prince George of Hesse-Darmstadt;
- 1694–1695: Col. Henri de Caumont, Marquis de Rada;
- 1695–1703: Col. Ventris Columbine (Dutch; Colembijn)
- 1703–1706: Col. James Rivers
- 1706–1708: Col. William Southwell
- 1708–1716: Col. Thomas Harrison
- 1716–1720: Col. Robert Dormer
- 1720–1738: Lt-Gen. James Dormer
- 1738–1765: Gen. John Guise

=== 6th Regiment of Foot – (1751) ===
- 1765–1773: Lt-Gen. William Rufane
- 1773: Lt-Gen. John Gore
- 1773–1787: Gen. Sir William Boothby, 4th Baronet
- 1787–1792: Lt-Gen. Lancelot Baugh

=== 6th (1st Warwickshire) Regiment – (1782) ===
- 1792–1795: Lt-Gen. Sir Ralph Abercromby, KB
- 1795–1806: F.M. William Frederick, Duke of Gloucester, KG
- 1806–1849: F.M. Sir George Nugent, Bt, GCB

=== 6th (Royal 1st Warwickshire) Regiment of Foot -(1832) ===
- 1849–1851: Lt-Gen. Sir John Gardiner, KCB
- 1851–1861: Gen. Henry James Riddell, KH
- 1861–1869: Gen. Sir Charles Gore, GCB, KH

=== Royal Warwickshire Regiment – (1881) ===
- 1869–1885: Gen. John Ffolliott Crofton
- 1885–1895: Gen. Sir Frances Colborne KCB
- 1895–1897: Gen. Robert Walter Macleod Fraser
- 1897–1904: Lt-Gen. Sir Frederick Traill-Burroughs KCB
- 1904–1921: Maj-Gen Sir Henry Broome Feilden KCB CMG
- 1921–1925: Lt-Gen. Sir Launcelot Kiggell KCB KCMG
- 1925–1935: Gen. Sir Robert Whigham GCB KCMG DSO
- 1935–1946: Brig. Clement Thurstan Tomes CBE DSO MC
- 1947–1963: F. M. Bernard Montgomery, 1st Viscount Montgomery KG GCB DSO
- 1963–1968: Maj-Gen Ronald Clarence Macdonald CB DSO OBE

== Uniform and insignia ==
In 1751, the 6th Regiment of Foot (1st Warwickshire) wore red coats faced in yellow. The latter colour may have originated with the period of Dutch service under the House of Orange or simply been an arbitrary decision under James II. When retitled the Royal 1st Warwickshire Regiment in 1832 the facings were changed to royal blue. Officers wore silver braid and buttons until gold/bronze was adopted in 1830. While its origins are obscure, the Antelope insignia (see illustration above) of the regiment was sufficiently long-established to be described as its "ancient badge".

Until World War I, both the Antelope badge and dark blue facings remained as primary distinctions on the scarlet and blue full dress of the regiment. On the simplified dark blue "No. 1 Dress" worn by most of the British Army as full dress after World War II, for reasons of contrast, the blue facings were changed to red piping edging the shoulder straps.

== Alliances ==
- (Canada) The South Saskatchewan Regiment
- (New Zealand) The Hauraki Regiment

== Sources ==
- Cannon, Richard (1829). History of the Sixth or Royal First Warwickshire Regiment of Foot. Longman, Orme & Co. ISBN 9780665483431.
- Cunliffe, Marcus (1956). History of the Royal Warwickshire Regiment 1919–1955. The Royal Warwickshire Regiment.
- J.B.M. Frederick, Lineage Book of British Land Forces 1660–1978, Volume I, 1984: Microform Academic Publishers, Wakfield, United Kingdom. ISBN 1-85117-007-3.
- J.B.M. Frederick, Lineage Book of British Land Forces 1660–1978, Vol II, Wakefield: Microform Academic, 1984, ISBN 1-85117-009-X.
- Lt-Col H.F. Joslen, Orders of Battle, United Kingdom and Colonial Formations and Units in the Second World War, 1939–1945, London: HM Stationery Office, 1960/London: London Stamp Exchange, 1990, ISBN 0-948130-03-2/ Uckfield: Naval & Military Press, 2003, ISBN 1-843424-74-6.
- Moberly, F. J. (1987) [1929]. Operations in Persia 1914–1919. History of the Great War based on Official Documents by Direction of the Committee of Imperial Defence (Imperial War Museum facsimile of the confidential 1929 ed.). London: HMSO. ISBN 978-0-11-290453-3.
- Ray Westlake, The Territorials 1908–1914; A Guide for Military and Family Historians, 2011: Pen & Sword Military, Barnsley, United Kingdom. ISBN 978-1-84884-360-8.
