= 182nd Field Regiment, Royal Artillery =

12th Bn, Royal Warwickshire Regiment 182nd Field Regiment, RA
- Cap badge of the Royal Artillery.
- Active: 19 February 1942–27 December 1944
- Country: United Kingdom
- Branch: British Army
- Type: Field artillery
- Size: 3 Batteries
- Part of: 38th (Welsh) Infantry Division

The 182nd Field Regiment was a unit of the Royal Artillery, formed by the British Army during World War II. First raised in 1940 as infantry of the Royal Warwickshire Regiment, which served in the Battle of France, it was converted to the field artillery role in 1942, serving as a reserve unit in Home Defence. It was disbanded before the end of the war.

== 12th Royal Warwickshire Regiment ==
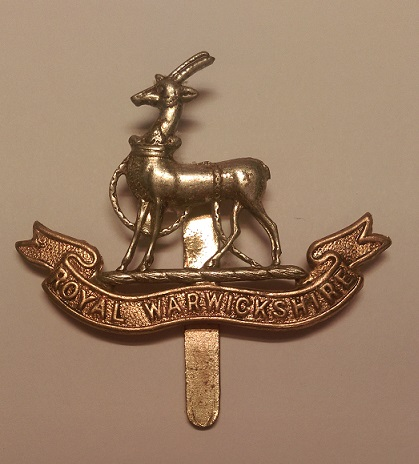
Cap badge of the Royal Warwickshire Regiment.

On 18 January 1940, as part of the rapid expansion of the British Army early in World War II, the Royal Warwickshire Regiment formed a new 12th (Garrison) Battalion (or 12th (Overseas Defence) Battalion) at Newton Abbot in Devonshire. (A previous 12th (Reserve) Battalion had been raised as part of Kitchener's Army during World War I of 1914–18.) Formed mainly from ex-servicemen around the age of 35–50, the battalion was sent to France in March 1940 to work on the Lines of Communication (LoCs) of the British Expeditionary Force (BEF). When the German Wehrmacht broke through the Ardennes and cut off the bulk of the BEF in the Dunkirk pocket, many of the LoC troops were in the base areas south of the River Somme. While some were involved in fighting at the Somme crossings, the rest were withdrawn. After the BEF had been evacuated from Dunkirk, there was a shortlived plan to organise a Second BEF in western France, but this was abandoned after the French surrender and the remaining troops in France were evacuated in Operation Aerial. 12th Royal Warwicks was taken off from Brest and Saint-Malo on 16/17 June 1940 without a single casualty.

After its return to England the battalion was employed in garrison and LoC duties in the UK. As the invasion threat receded, many infantry battalions in the defences were converted to other roles. At the beginning of 1942, 12th Royal Warwickshire was selected for conversion into a field regiment of the Royal Artillery.

== 182nd Field Regiment, RA ==
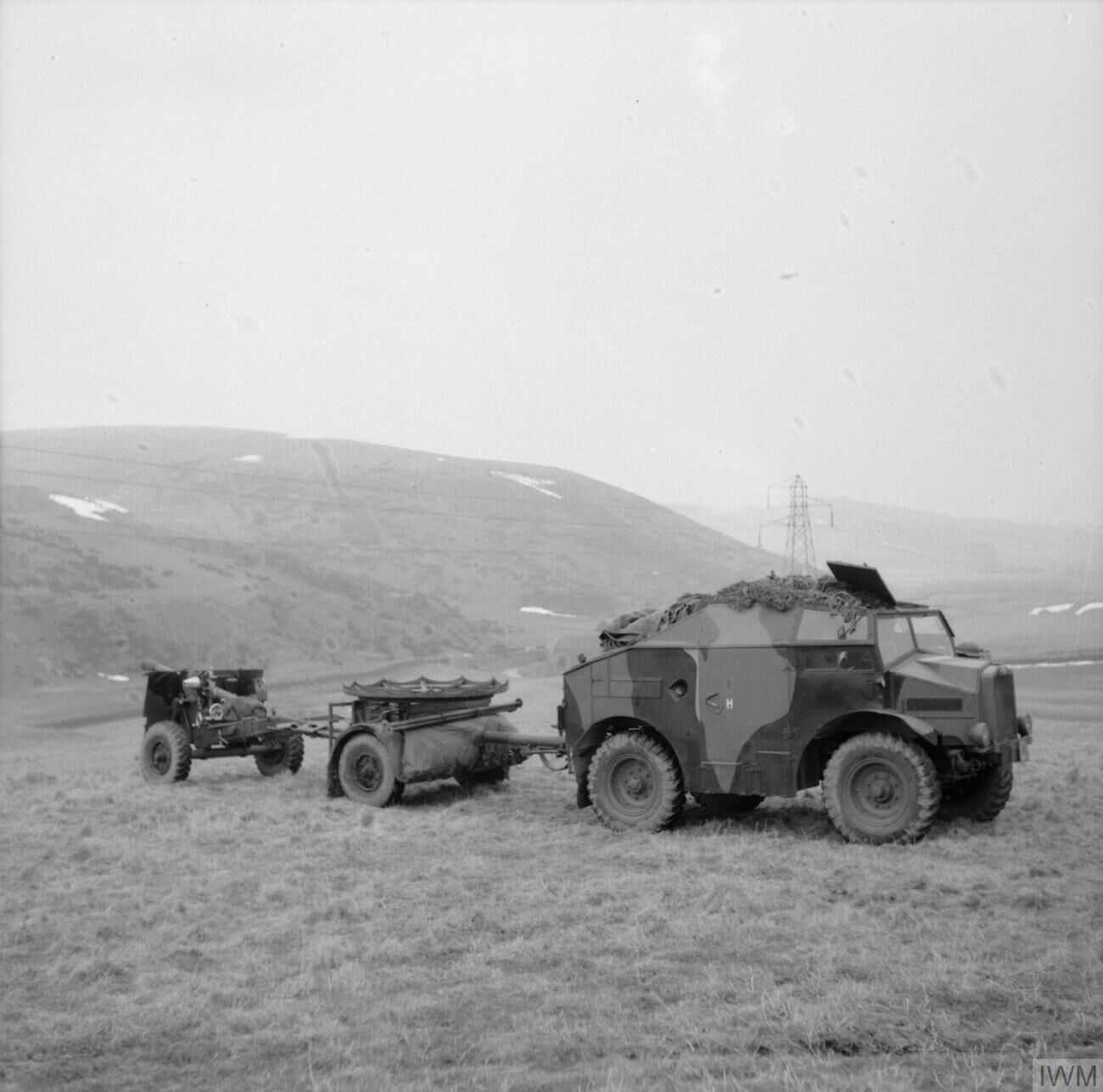
25-pounder gun and Morris C8 Quad tractor on exercises in the UK.

182nd Field Regiment, was formed at Oldmeldrum, Aberdeenshire, on 19 February 1942 and absorbed the other ranks of 12th Royal Warwicks; the battalion was formally disbanded on 19 March. The regiment consisted of regimental headquarters (RHQ) and three batteries, the cadres of which were provided by the three field regiments of 52nd (Lowland) Infantry Division:

- Q Bty from 78th (Lowland) Fd Rgt
- R Bty from 79th (Lowland) Fd Rgt
- S Bty from 80th (Lowland – City of Glasgow) Fd Rgt

The batteries were redesignated P, Q and R on 11 March, and finally numbered as 180, 181 and 182 Field Btys on 1 January 1943. Each battery was equipped with eight Mk II 25-pounder guns.

38th (Welsh) Infantry Division's shoulder insignia.

For some months the regiment was assigned to the GHQ Reserve, then on 2 January 1943 it joined 38th (Welsh) Infantry Division. 38th (W) Division was stationed in the South Coast defences of the Hampshire & Dorset District. As a 'lower establishment' formation it was not expected to serve overseas, although it was briefly assigned to XII Corps from 20 May to 6 June 1943. It then returned to the coast in East Kent District, before joining II Corps from 24 October 1943 to 17 January 1944.

In February 1944, 38th (W) Division provided part of the 'enemy' force in Exercise Eagle, a 12-day pre-invasion training exercise held on the Yorkshire Wolds for VIII Corps, which was to form part of 21st Army Group in the forthcoming Allied invasion of Normandy (Operation Overlord). Thereafter 38th (W) Division returned to Hampshire & Dorset District, supplying reinforcement drafts to 21st Army Group in Normandy, until 14 August, when the divisional HQ ceased to command units, which began to disperse.

182nd Field Regiment and its batteries were disbanded at Shanklin, Isle of Wight, on 27 December 1944.
