= Thorp Street drill hall =

Former military installation in Birmingham, England

- Birmingham
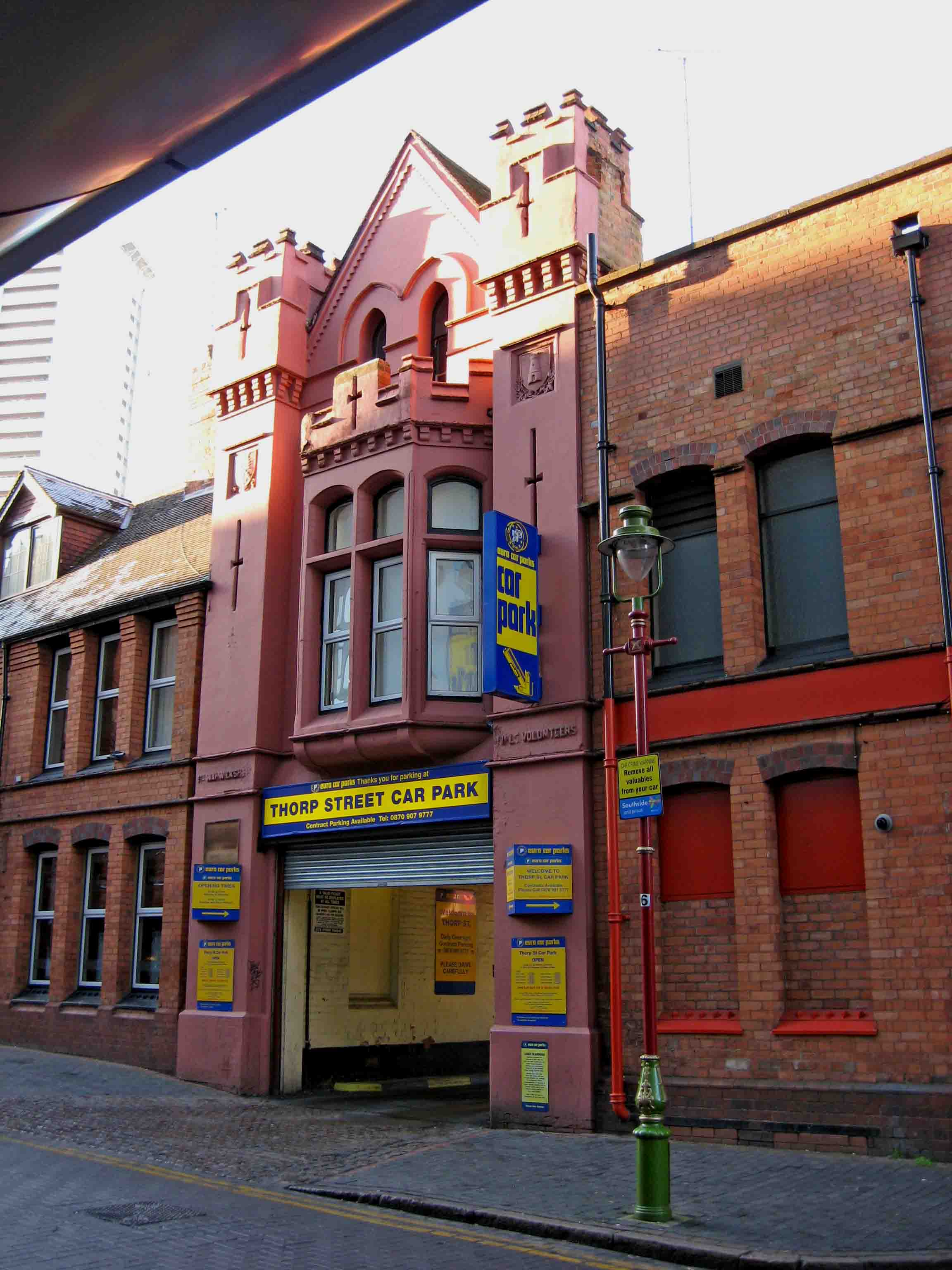
- Thorp Street drill hall, Birmingham

Site information
- Type: Drill hall

Location
- Location within West Midlands
- Coordinates: 52.47504°N 1.89911°W

Site history
- Built: 1881
- Built for: War Office
- In use: 1881-

The Thorp street drill hall is a former military installation in Birmingham, England.

== History ==
The building was designed by Frank Barlow Osborn as the headquarters of the 1st Volunteer Battalion, The Royal Warwickshire Regiment and was completed in 1881. This battalion split to become the 1st and 2nd Battalions of the Birmingham Rifles in 1891 and evolved to become the 5th and 6th Battalions of the Royal Warwickshire Regiment in 1908. The two battalions were mobilised at the drill hall in August 1914 before being deployed to the Western Front. In 1936, both units converted into anti-aircraft battalions, the 5th battalion as the 45th (The Royal Warwickshire Regiment) Anti-Aircraft Regiment and the 6th Battalion as the 69th (The Royal Warwickshire Regiment) Anti-Aircraft Regiment. While the 45th Regiment remained at Thorp Street, the 69th Regiment moved to Brandwood House in Kings Norton.

Following a re-organisation in the Royal Artillery, 580 (The Royal Warwickshire Regiment) Light Anti-Aircraft Regiment Royal Artillery was formed at the Thorp Street drill hall in 1947 and, following a further amalgamation, 442 Light Anti-Aircraft Regiment, Royal Artillery was formed there in 1955. The regiment was broken up in 1961; the drill hall was subsequently decommissioned and substantially demolished and the former frontage now forms the entrance to a car park, in what is now the city's Gay Quarter.
