= Mary Welsh =

Air Chief Commandant Dame Mary Welsh DBE TD
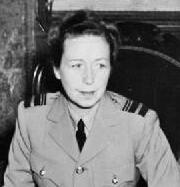
- Air Chief Commandant Welsh in 1945

Director of the Women's Auxiliary Air Force
- In office 1943–1946

Personal details
- Born: Ruth Mary Eldridge Dalzell; 2 August 1896 Claughton, Birkenhead, England
- Died: 25 June 1986 (aged 89) Farnborough, Hampshire, England
- Spouse: Air Marshal Sir William Welsh (m. 1922; div. 1947)
- Awards: Dame Commander of the Order of the British Empire; Territorial Efficiency Decoration

Military service
- Allegiance: United Kingdom
- Branch/service: First Aid Nursing Yeomanry; Auxiliary Territorial Service; Women's Auxiliary Air Force
- Years of service: 1918–1919; 1937–1946
- Rank: Air Chief Commandant
- Commands: Women's Auxiliary Air Force
- Battles/wars: First World War; Second World War

Air Chief Commandant Dame Ruth Mary Eldridge Welsh, DBE, TD (née Dalzell; 2 August 1896 – 25 June 1986) was the second Director of the British Women's Auxiliary Air Force (WAAF), from 1943 to 1946.

== Early life ==
Ruth Mary Eldridge Dalzell was born in Claughton, Birkenhead, the daughter of William Robert Dalzell and Ruth Mary Frances Annie Elizabeth Goldsworth Kirkpatrick Dalzell. Her father was a doctor.

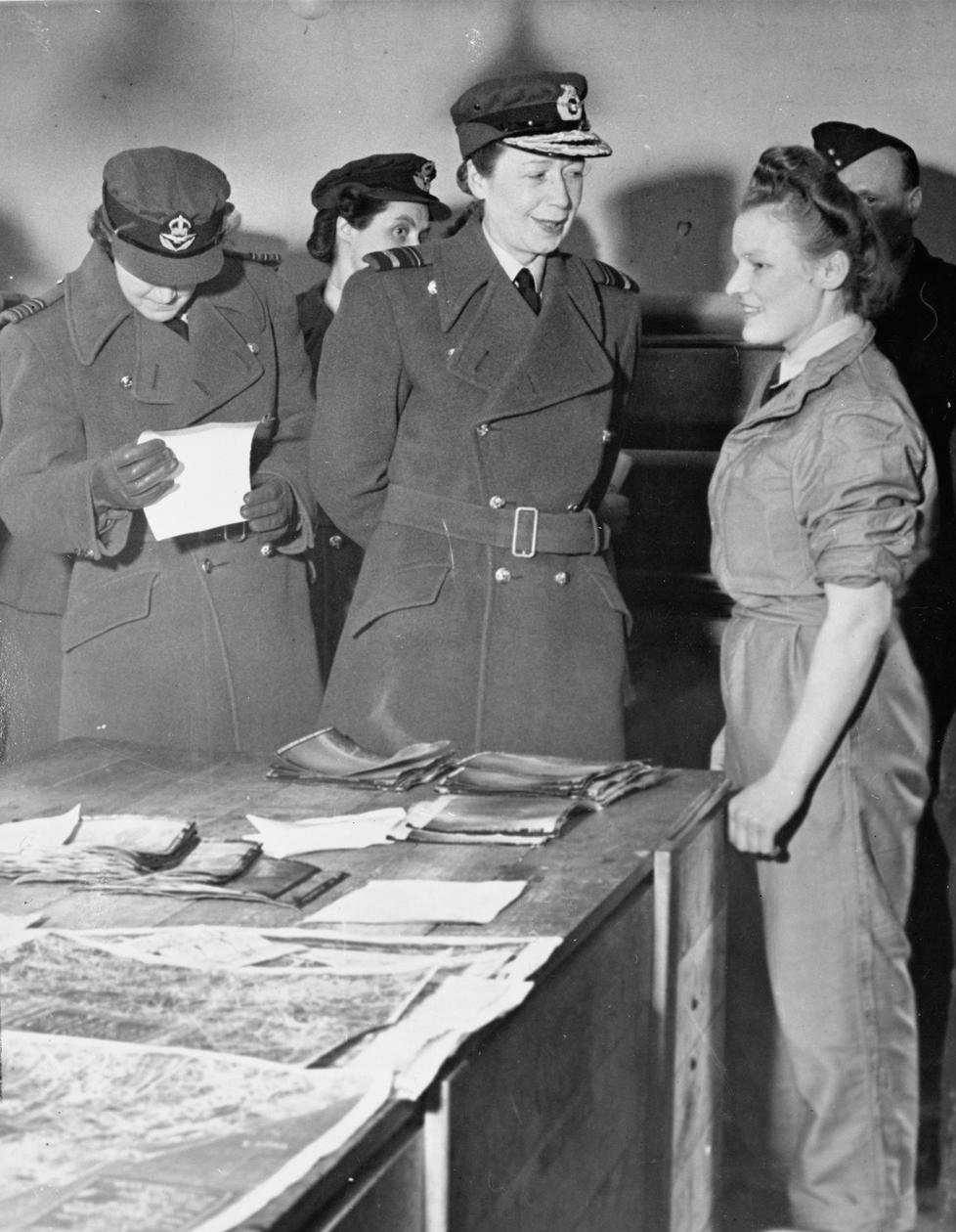
Air Chief Commandant Welsh talking with Leading Aircraftwoman Marjorie Nixon in the Sorting Room of the 2nd Tactical Air Force Photographic Negative Library at Keerbergen, during her visit to the WAAF in Belgium.

== Career ==
During the First World War, Mary Dalzell went to France as an ambulance driver in the First Aid Nursing Yeomanry, from October 1918 to June 1919.

As an Air Force wife, she travelled with her husband. In 1937, she joined the Emergency Service, and in 1938 the Auxiliary Territorial Service (ATS), the women's branch of the British Army. In 1939 she was promoted to the senior commandant, based in London; she was transferred later that year to the Women's Auxiliary Air Force (WAAF). She served as inspector-general from 1942 and succeeded Katherine Jane Trefusis-Forbes to become the second Director of the WAAF, from October 1943 to November 1946. In this work, she toured WAAF locations abroad, including Belgium, Italy, and India.

== Honours and awards ==
- 13 June 1946 – Air Chief Commandant Ruth Mary Eldridge, Lady Welsh, Women's Auxiliary Air Force, appointed a Dame Commander of the Order of the British Empire.
- 17 July 1973 – Air Chief Comdt. Dame Ruth Mary Welsh, DBE (L/No 29023 ATS later 291 WAAF), retired awarded the Territorial Efficiency Decoration.

== Personal life ==
Mary Dalzell married William Lawrie Welsh, an officer in the Royal Air Force, in 1922. They had a son, Michael, born in 1926. Her husband was knighted in 1941, making her Lady Welsh. The Welshes divorced in 1947, and she moved to Odiham, Hampshire. There she was active in historic preservation as president of the Odiham Society. Mary Welsh died, aged 89, on 25 June 1986, in Farnborough.
