= Robert Watson-Watt =

Scottish physicist who pioneered radio direction-finding and radar (1892–1973)

Sir Robert Watson-Watt KCB FRS FRAeS
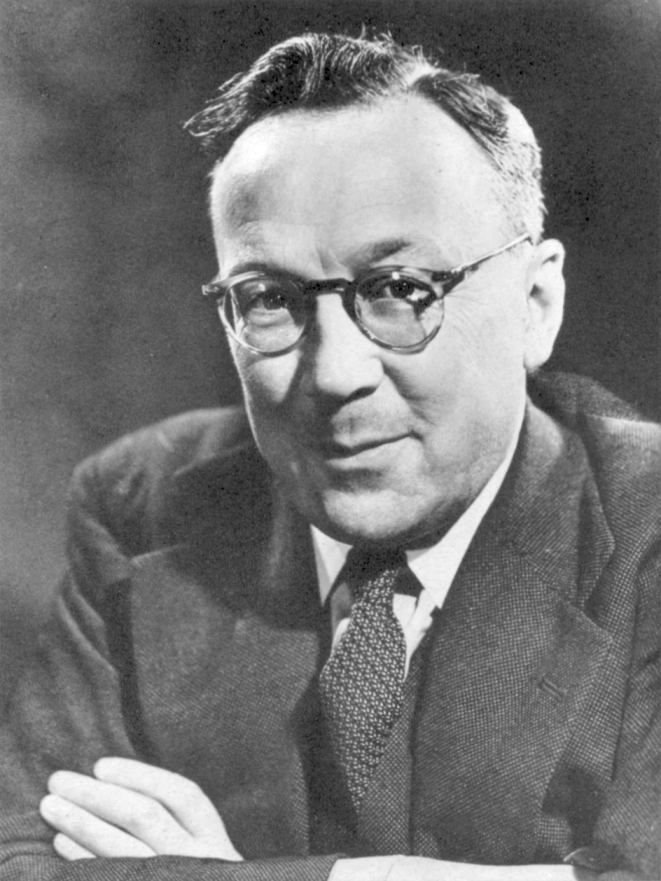
- Born: 13 April 1892; Brechin, Angus, Scotland
- Died: 5 December 1973 (aged 81); Inverness, Scotland
- Education: University of St Andrews; University of Dundee (BSc)
- Known for: Invention of radar
- Spouses: Margaret Robertson (m. 1916, divorced) Jean Wilkinson (m. 1952; died 1964) Dame Katherine Trefusis Forbes (m. 1966; died 1971)
- Awards: FRS (1941); Knighthood (1942); Medal for Merit (1946); Hughes Medal (1948); Elliott Cresson Medal (1957)

Sir Robert Alexander Watson-Watt (13 April 1892 – 5 December 1973) was a Scottish radio engineer and pioneer of radio direction finding and radar technology.

Watson-Watt began his career in radio physics with a job at the Meteorological Office, where he began looking for accurate ways to track thunderstorms using the radio waves given off by lightning. This led to the 1920s development of a system later known as high-frequency direction finding (HFDF or "huff-duff"). Although well publicized, the system's enormous military potential was not developed until the late 1930s. Huff-duff allowed operators to determine the location of an enemy radio transmitter in seconds and it became a major part of the network of systems that helped defeat the threat of German U-boats during World War II. It is estimated that huff-duff was used in about a quarter of all attacks on U-boats.

In 1935, Watson-Watt was asked to comment on reports of a German death ray based on radio. Watt and his assistant Arnold Frederic Wilkins quickly determined it was not possible, but Wilkins suggested using radio signals to locate aircraft at long distances. This led to a February 1935 demonstration of signals from a BBC short-wave transmitter bounced off a Handley Page Heyford aircraft. Watt led the development of a practical version of this device, which entered service in 1938 under the code name Chain Home. This system provided the vital advance information that helped the Royal Air Force in the Battle of Britain.

After the success of his invention, Watson-Watt was sent to the U.S. in 1941 to advise on air defence after Japan's attack on Pearl Harbor. He returned and continued to lead radar development for the War Office and Ministry of Supply. He was elected a Fellow of the Royal Society in 1941, knighted in 1942 and awarded the US Medal for Merit in 1946.

== Early years ==
Watson-Watt (Note: the hyphenated name is used herein for consistency, although he did not adopt it until 1942) was born in Brechin, Angus, Scotland, on 13 April 1892. He claimed to be a descendant of James Watt, the inventor of the practical steam engine, but no evidence of a family relationship has been found. After attending Damacre Primary School and Brechin High School, he was accepted at University College, Dundee (then part of the University of St Andrews, which became Queen's College, Dundee in 1954 and then the University of Dundee in 1967). Watson-Watt was a successful student, winning the Carnelley Prize for Chemistry and a class medal for Ordinary Natural Philosophy in 1910.

He graduated with a BSc in engineering in 1912, and was offered an assistantship by Professor William Peddie, the Chair of Physics at University College, Dundee from 1907 to 1942. Peddie encouraged Watson-Watt to study radio, then called "wireless telegraphy", and gave him effectively a postgraduate class on the physics of radio frequency oscillators and wave propagation. At the start of the Great War Watson-Watt was working as an assistant in the college Engineering Department.

== Early experiments ==
In 1916, Watson-Watt wanted a job with the War Office, but nothing obvious was available in communications. Instead, he joined the Meteorological Office, which was interested in his ideas on the use of radio for the detection of thunderstorms. Lightning gives off a radio signal as it ionizes the air, and his goal was to detect this signal to warn pilots of approaching thunderstorms. The signal occurs across a wide range of frequencies and could be easily detected and amplified by naval longwave sets. In fact, lightning was a major problem for communications at these common wavelengths.

His early experiments were successful in detecting the signal and he quickly proved to be able to do so at ranges up to 2,500 km (1500 miles). Location was determined by rotating a loop antenna to maximize (or minimise) the signal, thus "pointing" to the storm. The strikes were so fleeting that it was very difficult to turn the antenna in time to positively locate one. Instead, the operator would listen to many strikes and develop a rough average location.

At first, he worked at the Wireless Station of Air Ministry Meteorological Office in Aldershot, Hampshire. In 1924 when the War Department gave notice that they wished to reclaim their Aldershot site, he moved to Ditton Park near Slough, Buckinghamshire. The National Physical Laboratory (NPL) was already using this site and had two main devices that would prove pivotal to his work.

The first was an Adcock antenna, an arrangement of four masts that allowed the direction of a signal to be detected through phase differences. Using pairs of these antennas positioned at right angles, one could make a simultaneous measurement of the lightning's direction on two axes. Displaying the fleeting signals was a problem. This was solved by the second device, the WE-224 oscilloscope, recently acquired from Bell Labs. By feeding the signals from the two antennae into the X and Y channels of the oscilloscope, a single strike caused the appearance of a line on the display, indicating the direction of the strike. The scope's relatively "slow" phosphor only allowed the signal to be read long after the strike had occurred. Watt's new system was being used in 1926 and was the topic of an extensive paper by Watson-Watt and Herd.

The Met and NPL radio teams were amalgamated in 1927 to form the Radio Research Station with Watson-Watt as director. Continuing research throughout, the teams had become interested in the causes of "static" radio signals and found that much could be explained by distant signals located over the horizon being reflected off the upper atmosphere. This was the first direct indication of the reality of the Heaviside layer, proposed earlier, but at this time largely dismissed by engineers. To determine the altitude of the layer, Watt, Appleton and others developed the 'squegger' to develop a 'time base' display, which would cause the oscilloscope's dot to move smoothly across the display at very high speed. By timing the squegger so that the dot arrived at the far end of the display at the same time as expected signals reflected off the Heaviside layer, the altitude of the layer could be determined. This time-base circuit was key to the development of radar. After a further reorganization in 1933, Watt became Superintendent of the Radio Department of NPL in Teddington.

== RADAR ==
=== The air defence problem ===
During the First World War, the Germans had used Zeppelins as long-range bombers over Britain and defences had struggled to counter the threat. Since that time, aircraft capabilities had improved considerably and the prospect of widespread aerial bombardment of civilian areas was causing the government anxiety. Heavy bombers were now able to approach at altitudes that anti-aircraft guns of the day were unable to reach. With enemy airfields across the English Channel potentially only 20 minutes' flying-time away, bombers would have dropped their bombs and be returning to base before any intercepting fighters could get to altitude. The only answer seemed to be to have standing patrols of fighters in the air, but with the limited cruising time of a fighter, this would require a huge air force. An alternative solution was urgently needed and, in 1934, the Air Ministry set up a committee, the CSSAD (Committee for the Scientific Survey of Air Defence), chaired by Sir Henry Tizard to find ways to improve air defence in the UK.

Rumours that Nazi Germany had developed a "death ray" that was capable of destroying towns, cities and people using radio waves, were given attention in January 1935 by Harry Wimperis, Director of Scientific Research at the Air Ministry. He asked Watson-Watt about the possibility of building their version of a death-ray, specifically to be used against aircraft. Watson-Watt quickly returned a calculation carried out by his young colleague, Arnold Wilkins, showing that such a device was impossible to construct, and fears of a Nazi version soon vanished. He also mentioned in the same report a suggestion that was originally made to him by Wilkins, who had recently heard of aircraft disturbing shortwave communications, that radio waves might be capable of detecting aircraft, "Meanwhile, attention is being turned to the still difficult, but less unpromising, problem of radio detection and numerical considerations on the method of detection by reflected radio waves will be submitted when required". Wilkins's idea, checked by Watt, was promptly presented by Tizard to the CSSAD on 28 January 1935.

=== Aircraft detection and location ===
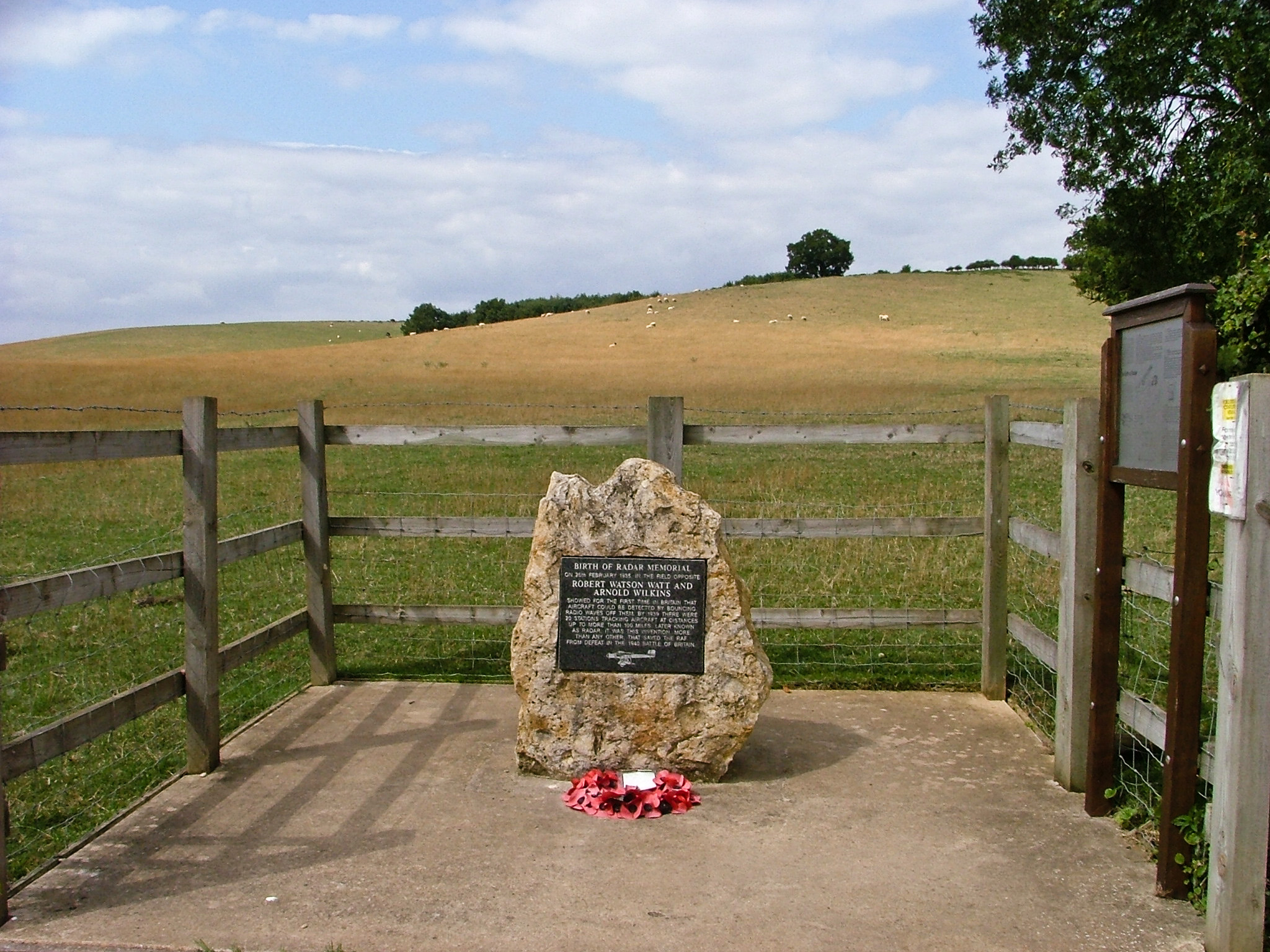
Memorial at the Daventry site of the first successful RADAR experiments. 52.195982°N 1.050121°W

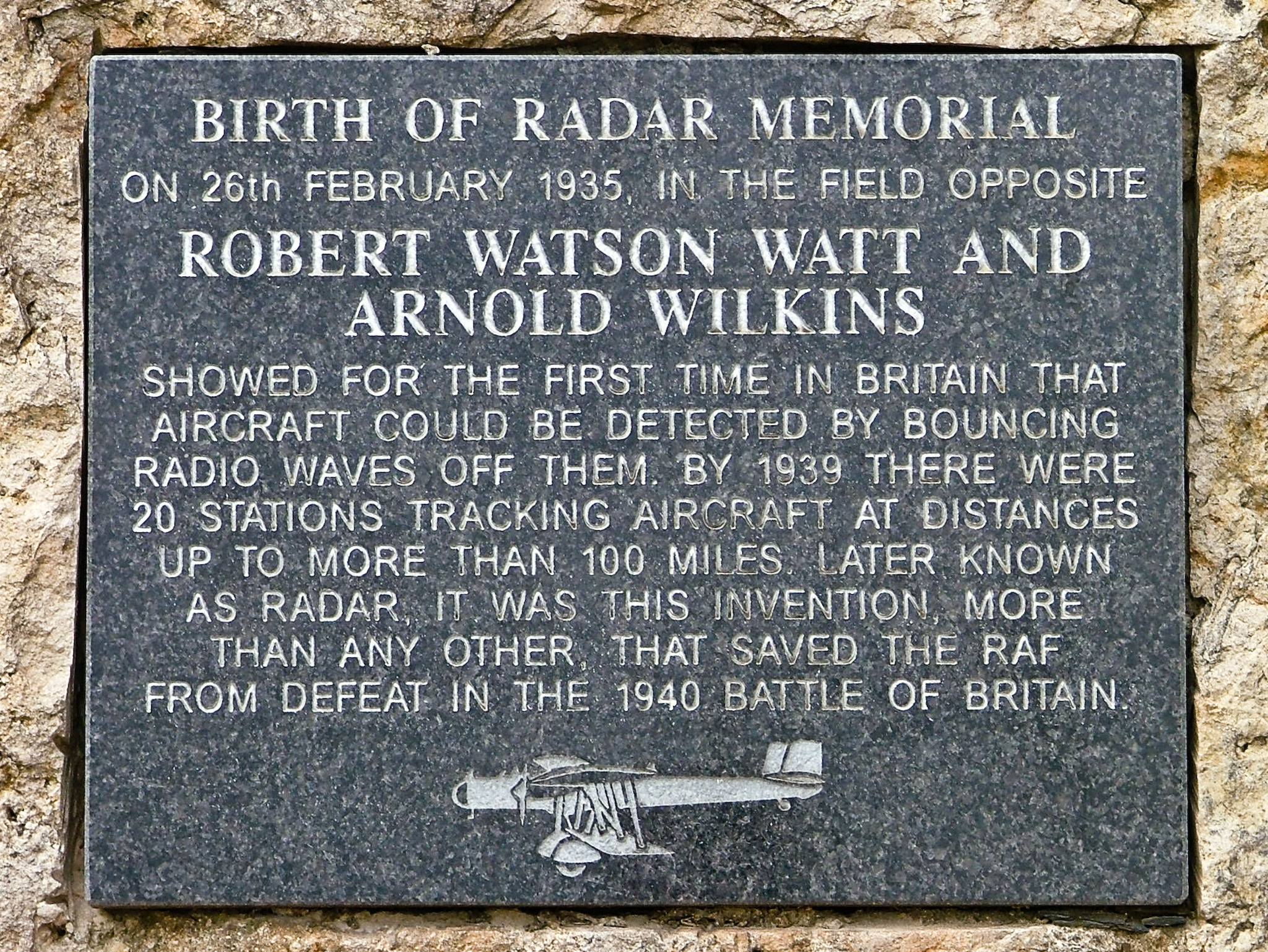
Closeup of memorial plaque

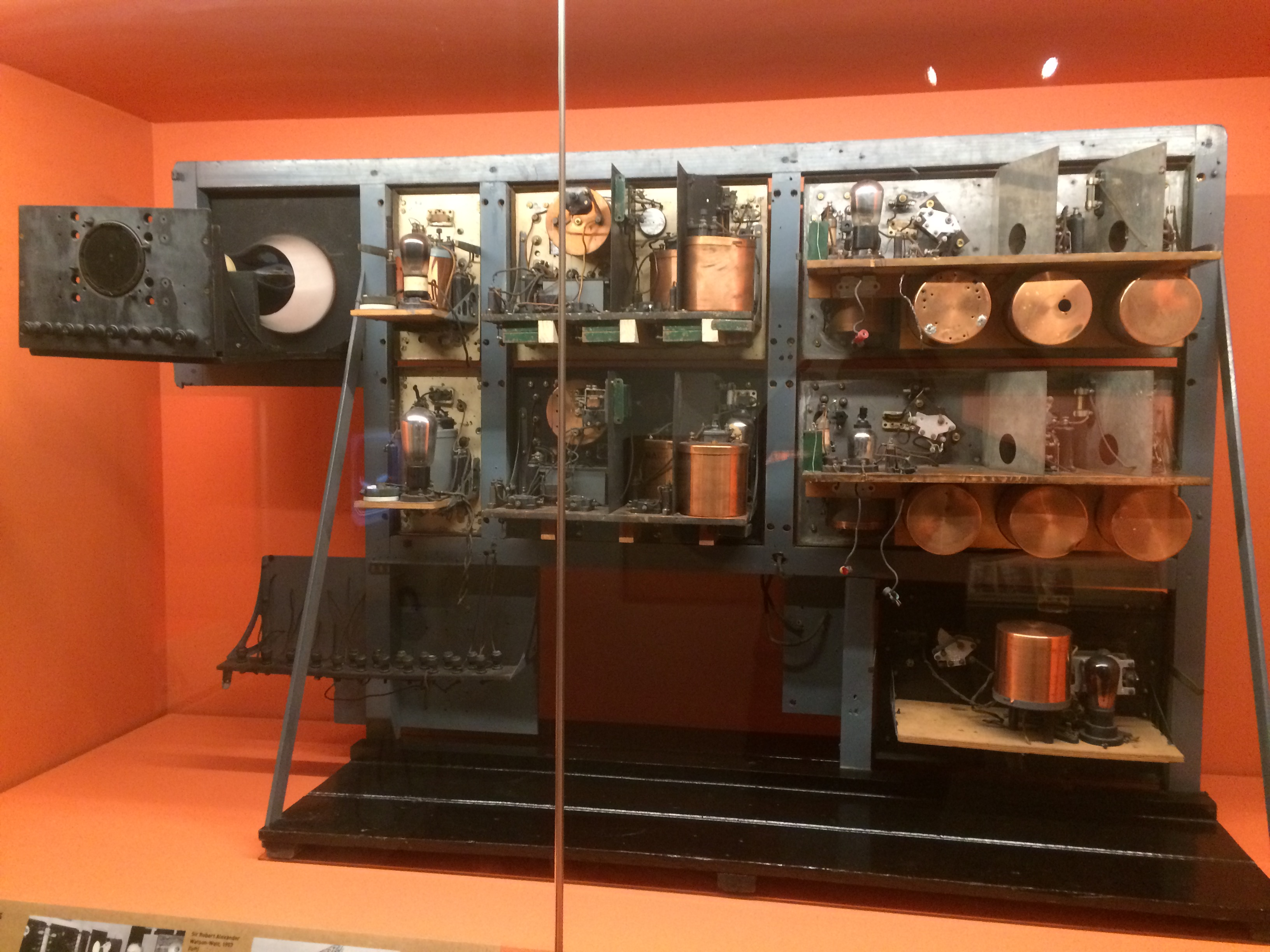
The first workable radar unit constructed by Robert Watson Watt and his team

On 12 February 1935, Watson-Watt sent the secret memo of the proposed system to the Air Ministry, Detection and location of aircraft by radio methods. Although not as exciting as a death-ray, the concept clearly had potential, but the Air Ministry, before giving funding, asked for a demonstration proving that radio waves could be reflected by an aircraft. This was ready by 26 February and consisted of two receiving antennae located about 6 miles (10 km) away from one of the BBC's shortwave broadcast stations at Daventry. The two antennae were phased such that signals travelling directly from the station cancelled themselves out, but signals arriving from other angles were admitted, thereby deflecting the trace on a CRT indicator (passive radar). Such was the secrecy of this test that only three people witnessed it: Watson-Watt, his colleague Arnold Wilkins, and a single member of the committee, A. P. Rowe. The demonstration was a success: on several occasions, the receiver showed a clear return signal from a Handley Page Heyford bomber flown around the site. Prime Minister Stanley Baldwin was kept quietly informed of radar progress. On 2 April 1935, Watson-Watt received a patent on a radio device for detecting and locating an aircraft.

In mid-May 1935, Wilkins left the Radio Research Station with a small party, including Edward George Bowen, to start further research at Orford Ness, an isolated peninsula on the Suffolk coast of the North Sea. By June, they were detecting aircraft at a distance of 16 mi (26 km), which was enough for scientists and engineers to stop all work on competing sound-based detection systems. By the end of the year, the range was up to 60 mi (97 km), at which point, plans were made in December to set up five stations covering the approaches to London.

One of these stations was to be located on the coast near Orford Ness, and Bawdsey Manor was selected to become the main centre for all radar research. To put a radar defence in place as quickly as possible, Watson-Watt and his team created devices using existing components, rather than creating new components for the project, and the team did not take additional time to refine and improve the devices. So long as the prototype radars were in workable condition, they were put into production. They conducted "full scale" tests of a fixed radar radio tower system, attempting to detect an incoming bomber by radio signals for interception by a fighter. The tests were a complete failure, with the fighter only seeing the bomber after it had passed its target. The problem was not the radar but the flow of information from trackers from the Observer Corps to the fighters, which took many steps and was very slow. Henry Tizard, Patrick Blackett, and Hugh Dowding immediately set to work on this problem, designing a 'command and control air defence reporting system' with several layers of reporting that were eventually sent to a single large room for mapping. Observers watching the maps would then tell the fighters what to do via direct communications.

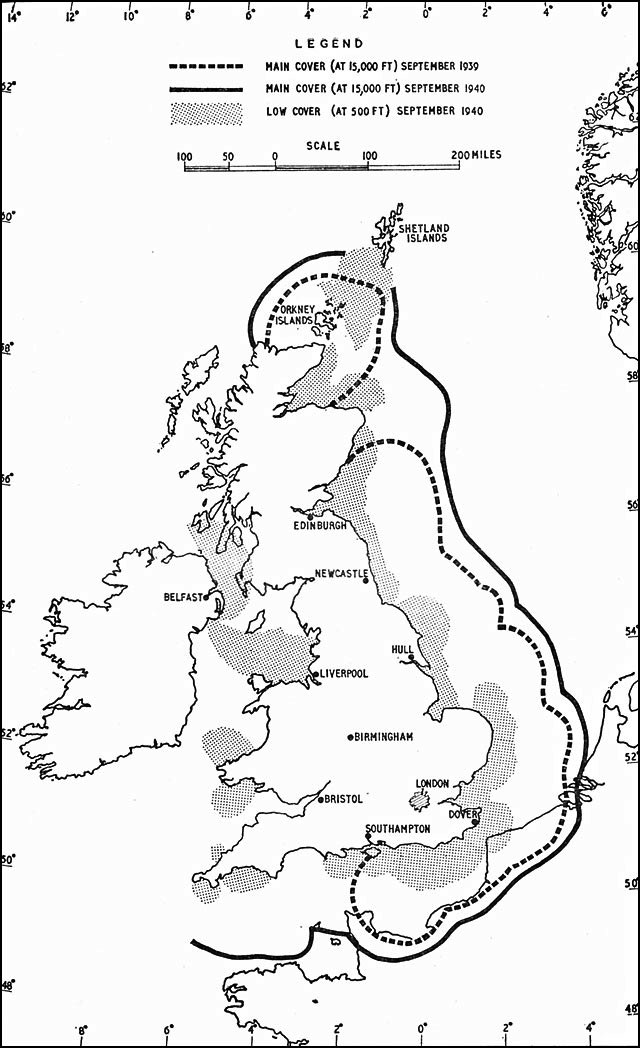
Radar coverage along the UK coast, 1939–1940

By 1937, the first three stations were ready, and the associated system was put to the test. The results were encouraging, and the government immediately commissioned construction of 17 additional stations. This became Chain Home, the array of fixed radar towers on the east and south coasts of England. By the start of World War II, 19 were ready for the Battle of Britain, and by the end of the war, over 50 had been built. The Germans were aware of the construction of Chain Home but were not sure of its purpose. They tested their theories with a flight of the Zeppelin LZ 130 but concluded the stations were a new long-range naval communications system.

As early as 1936, it was realized that the Luftwaffe would turn to night bombing if the day campaign did not go well. Watson-Watt had put another of the staff from the Radio Research Station, Edward Bowen, in charge of developing a radar that could be carried by a fighter. Night-time visual detection of a bomber was good to about 300 yards (metres) and the existing Chain Home systems simply did not have the accuracy needed to get the fighters that close. Bowen decided that an airborne radar should not exceed 90 kg (200 lb) in weight or 8 ft³ (230 L) in volume and should require no more than 500 watts of power. To reduce the drag of the antennae, the operating wavelength could not be much greater than one metre, difficult for the day's electronics. However, aircraft interception (AI) radar was perfected by 1940 and was instrumental in eventually ending The Blitz of 1941. Watson-Watt justified his choice of a non-optimal frequency for his radar, with his oft-quoted "cult of the imperfect", which he stated as "Give them the third-best to go on with; the second-best comes too late; the best never comes".

== Civil Service trade union activities ==
Between 1934 and 1936, Watson-Watt was president of the Institution of Professional Civil Servants, now a part of Prospect, the "union for professionals". The union speculates that at this time he was involved in campaigning for an improvement in pay for Air Ministry staff.

== Contribution to Second World War ==
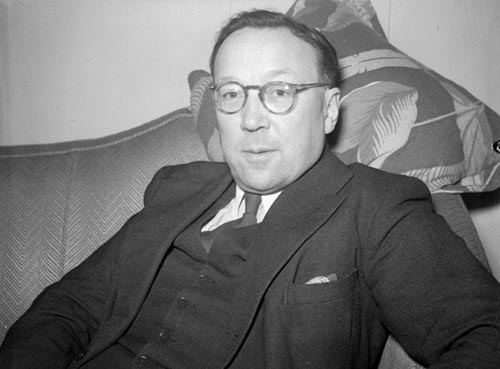
Sir Robert Alexander Watson-Watt, c. 1944

In his English History 1914–1945, the historian A. J. P. Taylor paid the highest of praise to Watson-Watt, Sir Henry Tizard and their associates who developed radar, crediting them with being fundamental to victory in the Second World War.

In July 1938, Watson-Watt left Bawdsey Manor and took up the post of Director of Communications Development (DCD-RAE). In 1939, Sir George Lee took over the job of DCD and Watson-Watt became Scientific Advisor on Telecommunications (SAT) to the Ministry of Aircraft Production, travelling to the US in 1941 to advise them on the severe inadequacies of their air defence, illustrated by the Pearl Harbor attack. He was knighted by George VI in 1942 and received the US Medal for Merit in 1946.

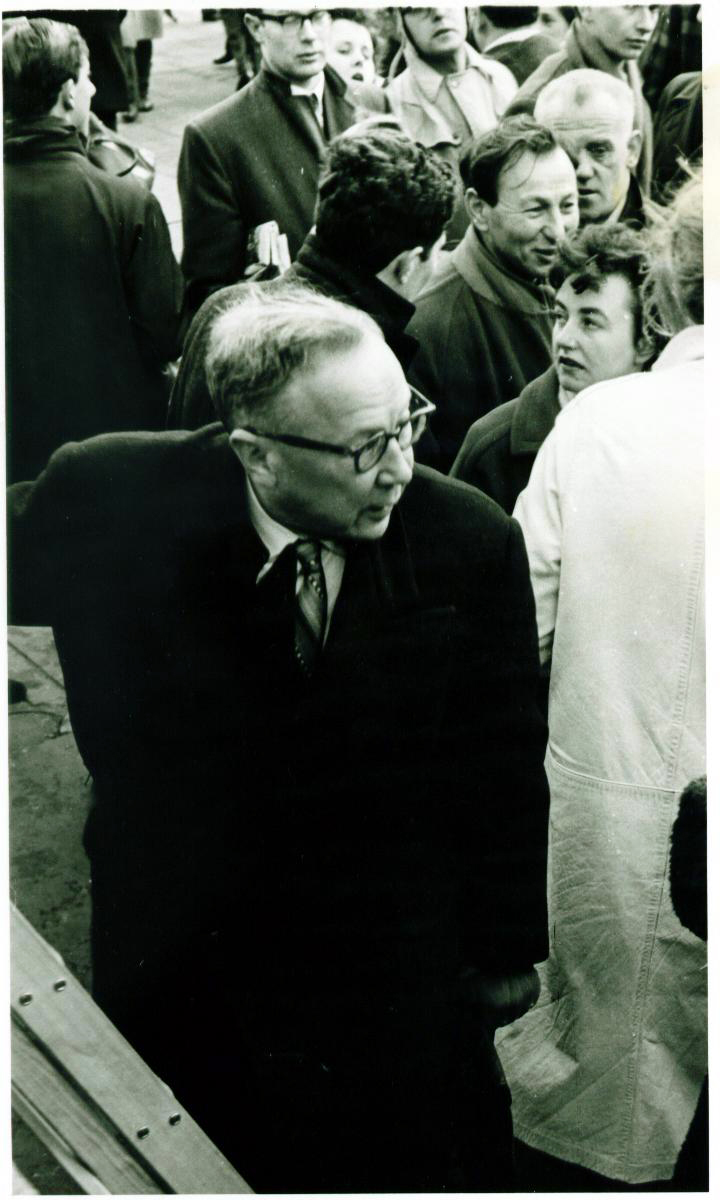
Sir Robert descends from a plinth in Trafalgar Square, London in 1961 after speaking at a rally protesting at the spread of nuclear weapons.

Ten years after his knighthood, Watson-Watt was awarded £50,000 by the UK government for his contributions in the development of radar. He established a practice as a consulting engineer. In the 1950s, he moved to Canada and later he lived in the US, where he published Three Steps to Victory in 1958. Around 1958, he appeared as a mystery challenger on the American television programme To Tell The Truth. In 1956, Watson-Watt reportedly was pulled over for speeding in Canada by a radar gun-toting policeman. His remark was, "Had I known what you were going to do with it I would never have invented it!" He wrote an ironic poem ("A Rough Justice") afterwards,

Pity Sir Robert Watson-Watt,
strange target of this radar plot

And thus, with others I can mention,
the victim of his own invention.

His magical all-seeing eye
enabled cloud-bound planes to fly

but now by some ironic twist
it spots the speeding motorist

and bites, no doubt with legal wit,
the hand that once created it.

...

== Honours ==
- In 1945, Watson-Watt was invited to deliver the Royal Institution Christmas Lecture on Wireless.
- In 1949, a Watson-Watt Chair of Electrical Engineering was established at University College, Dundee.
- In 2013, he was one of four inductees to the Scottish Engineering Hall of Fame.

== Legacy ==
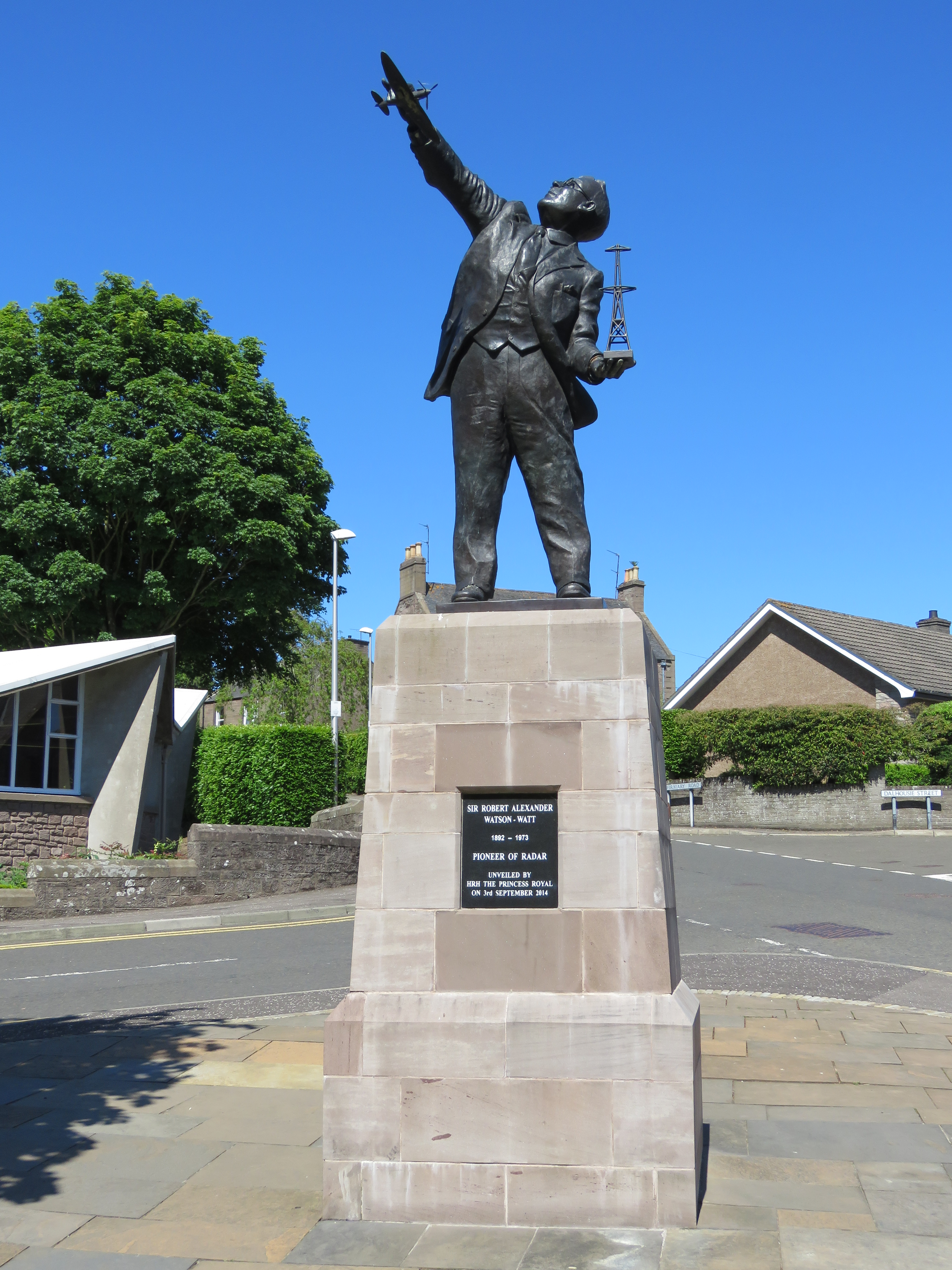
Memorial to Watson-Watt at Brechin in Angus, Scotland

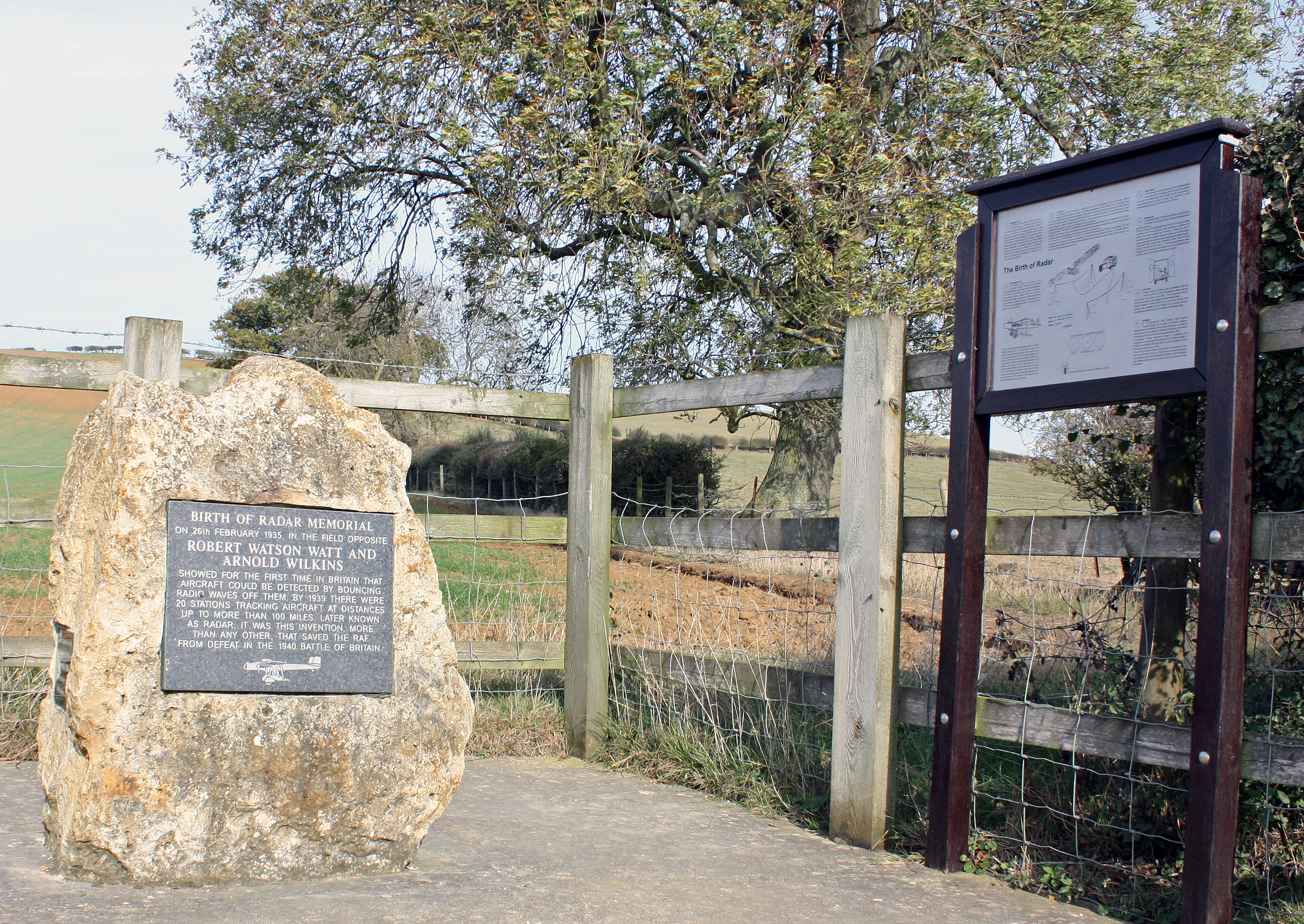
Memorial to the Birth of Radar, at Stowe Nine Churches, naming Watson-Watt and Arnold Wilkins

On 3 September 2014, a statue of Sir Robert Watson-Watt was unveiled in Brechin by the Princess Royal. One day later, the BBC Two drama Castles in the Sky, aired with Eddie Izzard in the role of Watson Watt.

A collection of some of the correspondence and papers of Watson-Watt is held by the National Library of Scotland. A collection of papers relating to Watson-Watt is also held by Archive Services at the University of Dundee.

A briefing facility at RAF Boulmer has been named the Watson-Watt auditorium in his honour.

The Institution of Engineering and Technology operates a Watson-Watt room as a presentation space for rent.

== Business and financial life ==
Watson-Watt had a problematic business and financial life.

== Family life ==
Watson-Watt was married three times. He had a daughter with his second wife.

Watson-Watt was married on 20 July 1916 in Hammersmith, London to Margaret Robertson (1886–1988), a teacher from Perth, Scotland. In 1952 they divorced and he remarried. His second wife was a Canadian widow, Jean Wilkinson, who later died in 1964. He returned to Scotland in the 1960s, after the closure of his Canadian engineering business.

In 1966, at the age of 74, he married Dame Katherine Trefusis Forbes. She was 67 years old at the time and had also played a significant role in the Battle of Britain as the founding Air Commander of the Women's Auxiliary Air Force, which supplied the radar-room operatives. The couple lived in London during the winter, and at The Observatory, Trefusis Forbes' summer home, in Pitlochry, Perthshire, during the warmer months.

Watson-Watt died in 1973, aged 81 in Inverness, two years after his third wife. They are buried together in the churchyard of the Episcopal Church of the Holy Trinity in Pitlochry, Scotland.

== See also ==
- History of radar

== Sources ==
- Brown, Louis (1999). Technical and Military Imperatives: A Radar History of World War 2. CRC Press. ISBN 978-1-4200-5066-0.
- Lem, Elizabeth, The Ditton Park Archive
- Celinscak, Mark. "Robert Watson-Watt" in Philosophers of War: The Evolution of History's Greatest Military Thinkers. Santa Barbara: ABC-CLIO. p. 489.
- Sir Robert Watson-Watt bio
- The Royal Air Force Air Defence Radar Museum at RRH Neatishead, Norfolk
- The Watson-Watt Society of Brechin, Angus, Scotland
