= Margaret Robertson Watson-Watt =

Scottish teacher

Margaret, Lady Watson-Watt (3 May 1886 – 7 September 1988) was a Scottish teacher and metalworker who was married to Sir Robert Watson-Watt, known as the "father of radar". Lady Watson-Watt assisted in his experiments related to radio detection, using her skills to run and repair the apparatus he used to observe atmospherics. Their research partnership continued in Cairo, Khartoum and the Arctic Circle. Watson-Watt credited her contribution to the success of his research that led to the development of radar technology used in World War II.

== Early life ==
Margaret Robertson was born on 3 May 1886 in Perth, Scotland. Her father, David Robertson, was a draughtsman and at one time partner in Perth Foundry and her mother worked for Campbell's Dyeworks. Her grandfather founded a stationers and booksellers on Perth High Street. Robertson attended Perth Academy. She became a teacher in Dundee, where she attended evening classes at University College Dundee. As well as metalwork and jewellery-making, she attended classes taught by Robert Watson-Watt. The couple married in Hammersmith, London in July 1916.

== Development of radar ==
Watson-Watt moved with her husband to Farnborough when he began work with the Meteorological Office. They lived in one hut while carrying out research in a second one. At this time, she assisted his research by repairing the radio apparatus he used to detect thunderstorms, using the soldering skills from her evening classes. She also observed and recorded radio experiments. In 1923, Watson-Watt joined her husband in Alexandria and then travelled to Khartoum to study atmospherics, where they encountered some of the best thunderstorms they had ever seen. She later joined him at Tromsø, Norway to assist in his research.

Robert Watson-Watt was approached by the Air Ministry and began work on using radio to detect aircraft. He was granted a patent for a radio device in 1935 for what would become the Chain Home radar system used in World War II.

Robert Watson-Watt later credited his wife for her 'behind the scenes' contribution to the success of his research.

"The technique we worked out in those years has been extended over the whole field of radio research, and in that sense was the forerunner of the experiments that led to radio location."

When Robert Watson-Watt was knighted in 1942, Margaret became Lady Watson-Watt.

=== War service ===
In World War I, Margaret Watson-Watt worked for the Military Headquarters at Aldershot, transcribing morse code messages from Paris, and listening for the time signals from Berlin and Paris which she would telephone to HQ.

== Personal life ==
Watson-Watt divorced her husband in October 1952 on the grounds of adultery. The couple had no children.

She was twice fined for careless driving at Perth Sheriff Court. In 1954, she knocked down two people in George Street, Perth and was fined £5. In 1962, she was in a collision with another car on South Methven Street, Perth and was fined £6.

== Later life and death ==
Watson-Watt lived at Dunalastair, Muirton Bank, Perth. In 1972, she gained an A-level qualification in Italian aged 86. She spent her later years in St Johnstoun Nursing Home, Perth, where she celebrated her 100th birthday. She died on 7 September 1988, aged 102.
