= William Welsh (RAF officer) =

Royal Air Force Air Marshal (1891-1962)

Sir William Welsh
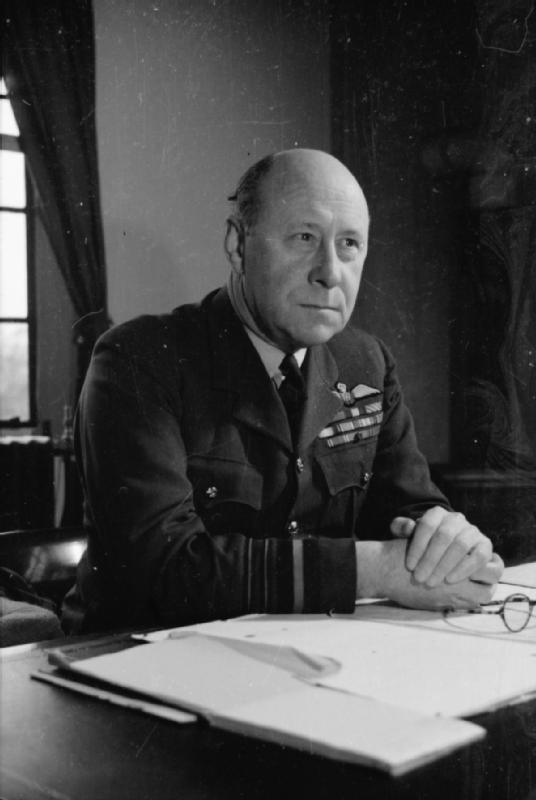
- Air Marshal Welsh, Air Officer Commanding-in-Chief, Flying Training Command, at his desk at the Air Ministry, London.
- Born: 10 February 1891; Biggleswade, Bedfordshire, England
- Died: 2 January 1962 (aged 70); Farmington, Connecticut, United States
- Relatives: Dame Mary Welsh (m. 1922-1947; divorced); Elysabeth Cochran Welsh (née Carrere; formerly Mrs Barbour) (m. 1947-1962; his death)
- Military career
- Allegiance: United Kingdom
- Branch: Royal Navy (1910–18); Royal Air Force (1918–44)
- Service years: 1910–1944
- Rank: Air marshal
- Commands: Eastern Air Command (1942–43); Flying Training Command (1941–42); Technical Training Command (1940–41); Reserve Command (1940); No. 11 Group (1940); Air Member for Supply and Organisation (1937–40); No. 203 Squadron (1931–34); Marine Aircraft Experimental Establishment (1930–31); RAF Kenley (1926); No. 14 Squadron (1920–21); No. 214 Squadron (1919); No. 217 Squadron (1918–19)
- Conflicts: First World War; Second World War
- Awards: Knight Commander of the Order of the Bath; Distinguished Service Cross; Air Force Cross; Mentioned in dispatches Officer of the Order of the Crown (Belgium); Croix de guerre (France); Grand Cross of the Order of Polonia Restituta (Poland); Commander of the Legion of Merit (United States)

Air Marshal Sir William Lawrie Welsh, KCB, DSC, AFC (10 February 1891 – 2 January 1962) was a Royal Air Force officer who commanded British air operations during Operation Torch.

== Early career ==
Welsh started his career in the Merchant Navy and from 1910 he was midshipman in the Royal Navy Reserve prior to the outbreak of the First World War, Welsh joined the Royal Naval Air Service in November 1914 as a pilot at RNAS Calshot. During the early years of the war, Welsh acted as a test pilot and became one of the first pilots to fly a plane off an early carrier, flying a Sopwith Schneider floatplane off HMS Campania, while sailing at approximately 18 knots, on 6 August 1915. He again repeated this on 3 November with the ship sailing at full speed. Welsh was shot down while flying a Sopwith Baby seaplane, landing only six miles northeast of Dunkirk on 23 April 1917, although he was unhurt in the crash.

In 1918, Welsh received his first command as head of No. 17 Squadron RNAS, which became No. 217 Squadron on the formation of the RAF and then went on to command No. 214 Squadron from January 1918. Stationed in Egypt, Welsh was awarded a permanent commission as a Major on 1 August 1919.

== Interwar years ==
Following the war, Welsh continued with developmental flying and, in 1921, he surveyed the air route from Jerusalem to Baghdad flying across the Syrian Desert. As commanding officer of No. 14 Squadron, Welsh would serve on the Air Staff at Middle East Area headquarters from August 1921. Serving in a number of staff and command positions during most of the 20s, Welsh served as commanding officer of the Marine Aircraft Experimental Establishment from September 1930 until his appointment as commanding officer of No. 203 Squadron in 1931. In 1934, Welsh became Director of Organization and within three years was named Air Member for Supply and Organisation. He was present at the funeral of King George V on 28 January 1936.

== Second World War ==
Welsh served as Air Officer Commanding-in-Chief of Reserve Command from April 1940, as Air Officer Commanding-in-Chief of Technical Training Command from May 1940 and as Air Officer Commanding-in-Chief of Flying Training Command from July 1941. Overseeing Eastern Air Command in 1942, Welsh was responsible for providing air support for allied forces in Algeria and Tunisia during Operation Torch. Welsh would later lead the RAF delegation in Washington, D.C. during 1943 and 1944 before his resignation on 1 December 1944.

== Later years ==
Following his retirement, Welsh stayed in the United States and eventually divorced his wife, Dame Mary Welsh, to marry, in 1947, Elysabeth Cochran Carrere; formerly Mrs Barbour, who was previously married to United States Senator Warren Barbour.

Welsh would later become the North American representative for the Society of Motor Manufacturers and Traders until his death on 2 January 1962.

Military offices
Unknown	Director of Organisation; 1934–1937	Succeeded by Charles Portal
Preceded by Cyril Newall	Air Member for Supply and Organisation; 1937–1940	Succeeded by Sir Christopher Courtney
Preceded by Leslie Gossage	Air Officer Commanding No. 11 Group; January – April 1940	Succeeded by Keith Park
Preceded by Sir John Steel	Air Officer Commanding-in-Chief Reserve Command; April 1940 – May 1940	Post disbanded
New command	Air Officer Commanding-in-Chief Technical Training Command; May 1940 – July 1941	Succeeded by Sir John Babington
Preceded by Sir Lawrence Pattinson	Air Officer Commanding-in-Chief Flying Training Command; 1941–1942	Succeeded by Sir Philip Babington
