= Women's Auxiliary Air Force =

British military service in World War II

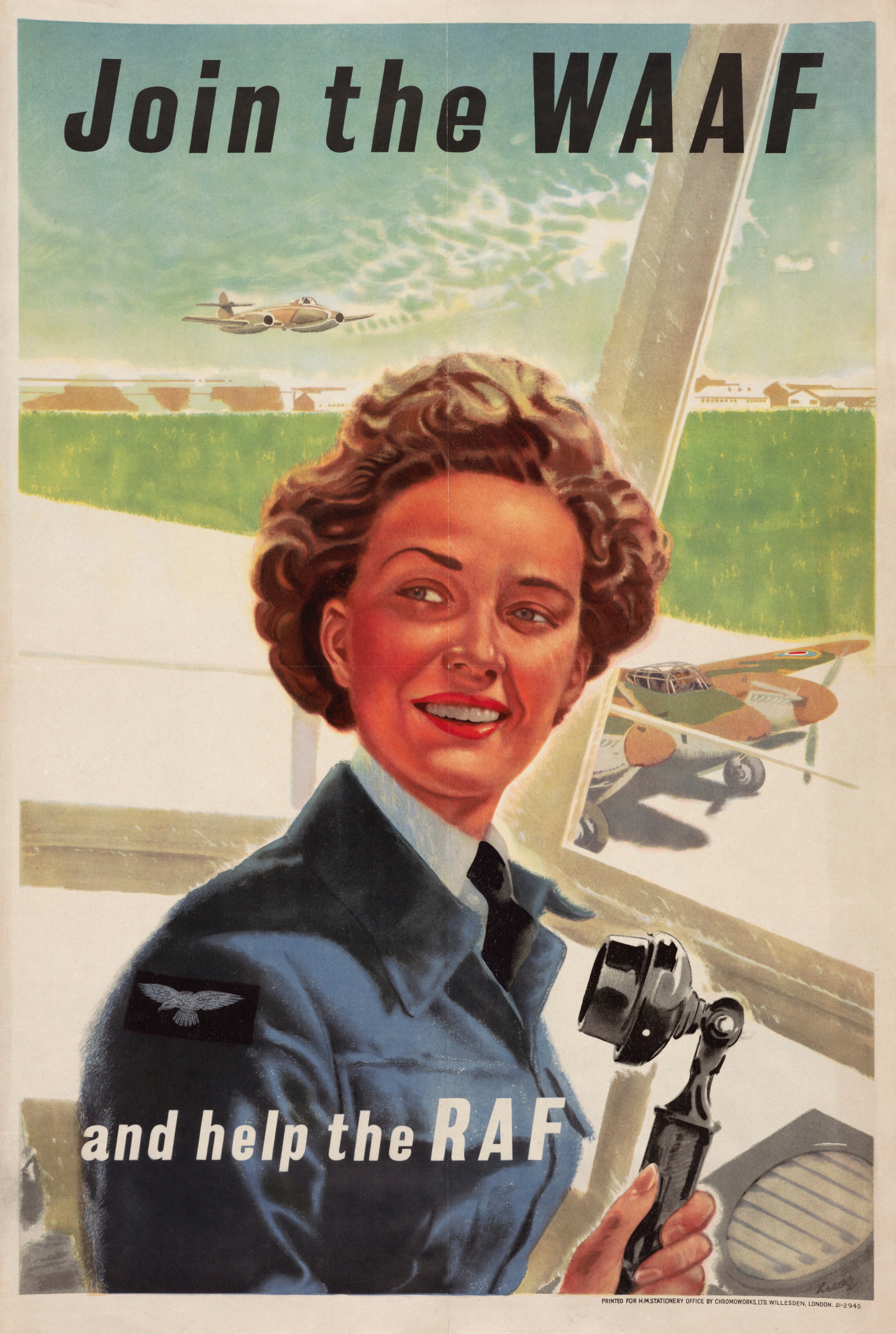
WAAF recruitment poster

The Women's Auxiliary Air Force (WAAF), whose members were referred to as WAAFs (/ˈwæfs/), was the female auxiliary of the British Royal Air Force during the Second World War. Established in 1939, WAAF numbers exceeded 181,000 at its peak strength in 1943, with over 2,000 women enlisting per week.

== History ==
A Women's Royal Air Force had existed from 1918 to 1920 but had been disbanded in the wake of the end of the First World War, alongside the Women's Army Auxiliary Corps (1917–1921) and the first iteration of the Women's Royal Naval Service (1917–1919).

In 1938, RAF companies began to be raised within the Auxiliary Territorial Service (ATS).

The Women's Auxiliary Air Force was created on 28 June 1939, absorbing the forty-eight RAF companies of the ATS, following the Munich Agreement. The WAAF was called up to service on 28 August 1939, to begin to free up the RAF for the impending war. Conscription of women did not begin until after December 1941 when the UK Government passed the National Service Act (No. 2), which was issued by Royal Proclamation on 10 January 1942. It only applied to those between 20 and 30 years of age and they had the choice of the military auxiliary services, the civilian Women's Land Army or factory work in support of the war effort.

By August 1939, the WAAF had 234 officers and 1,500 other ranks. The number of women in the WAAF peaked in 1943 at 181,835 (15.7% of the RAF), with over 2,000 women enlisting per week. By the end of the Second World War, around 250,000 women had served with the WAAF. By this point, WAAF enrolment had declined, and demobilisation saw over 100,000 women leave the WAAF. The remainder, now only several hundred strong, was renamed the Women's Royal Air Force on 1 February 1949.

== Training ==
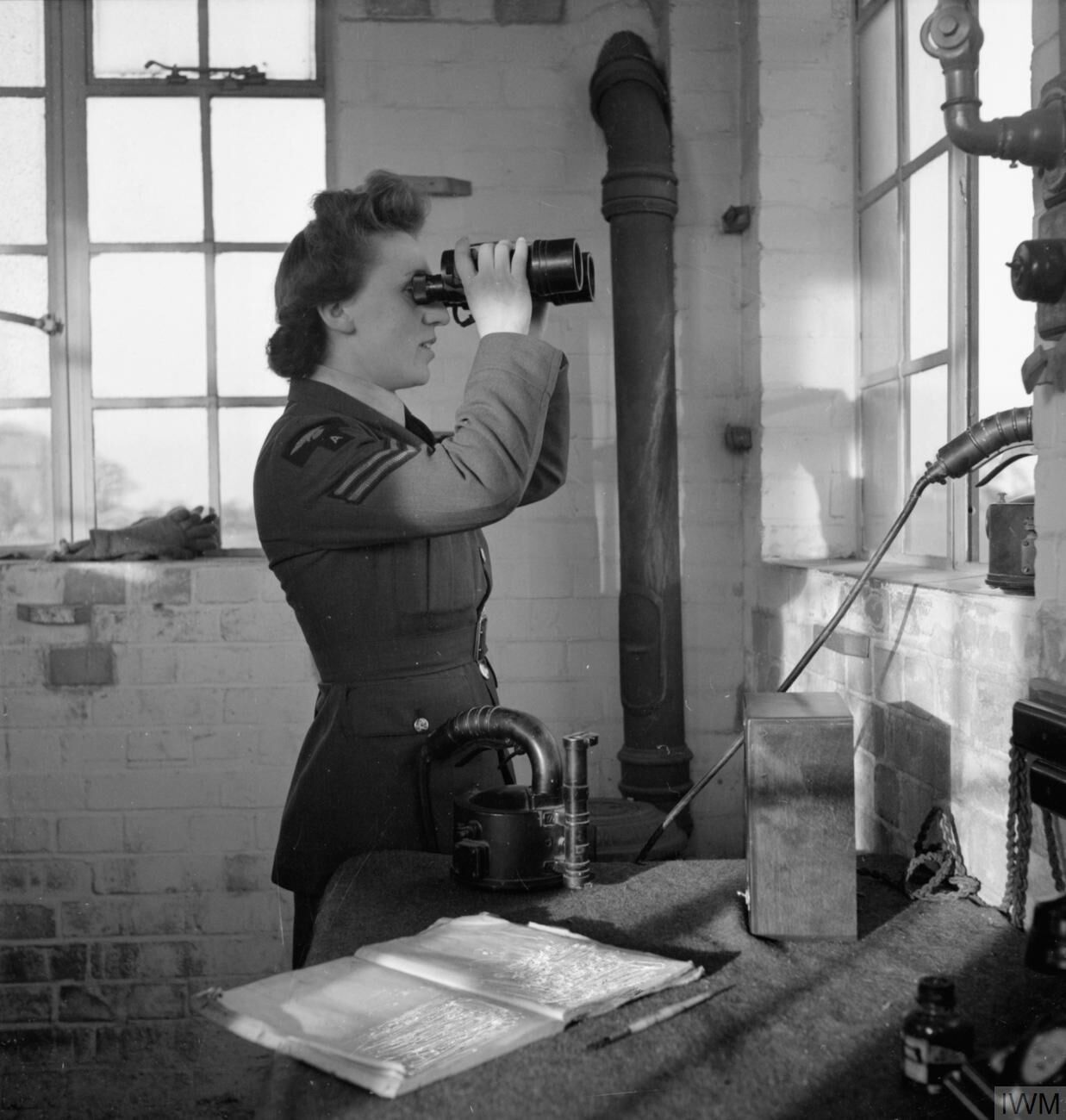
A WAAF corporal serving as an air traffic controller during the Second World War. Many jobs formerly held by men were filled by WAAFs due to wartime labour shortages.

On initial formation, WAAF companies were affiliated with squadrons in the Auxiliary Air Force, who were to provide training to WAAF officers and non-commissioned officers to prepare them administer the WAAF and lead airwomen should the WAAF be called up. After the WAAF was called up in August 1939, women recruited into the WAAF were given basic training at one of five sites, though not all of the sites ran training simultaneously. The five sites were at West Drayton, Harrogate, Bridgnorth, Innsworth and Wilmslow. All WAAF basic recruit training was located at Wilmslow from 1943.

== Roles ==
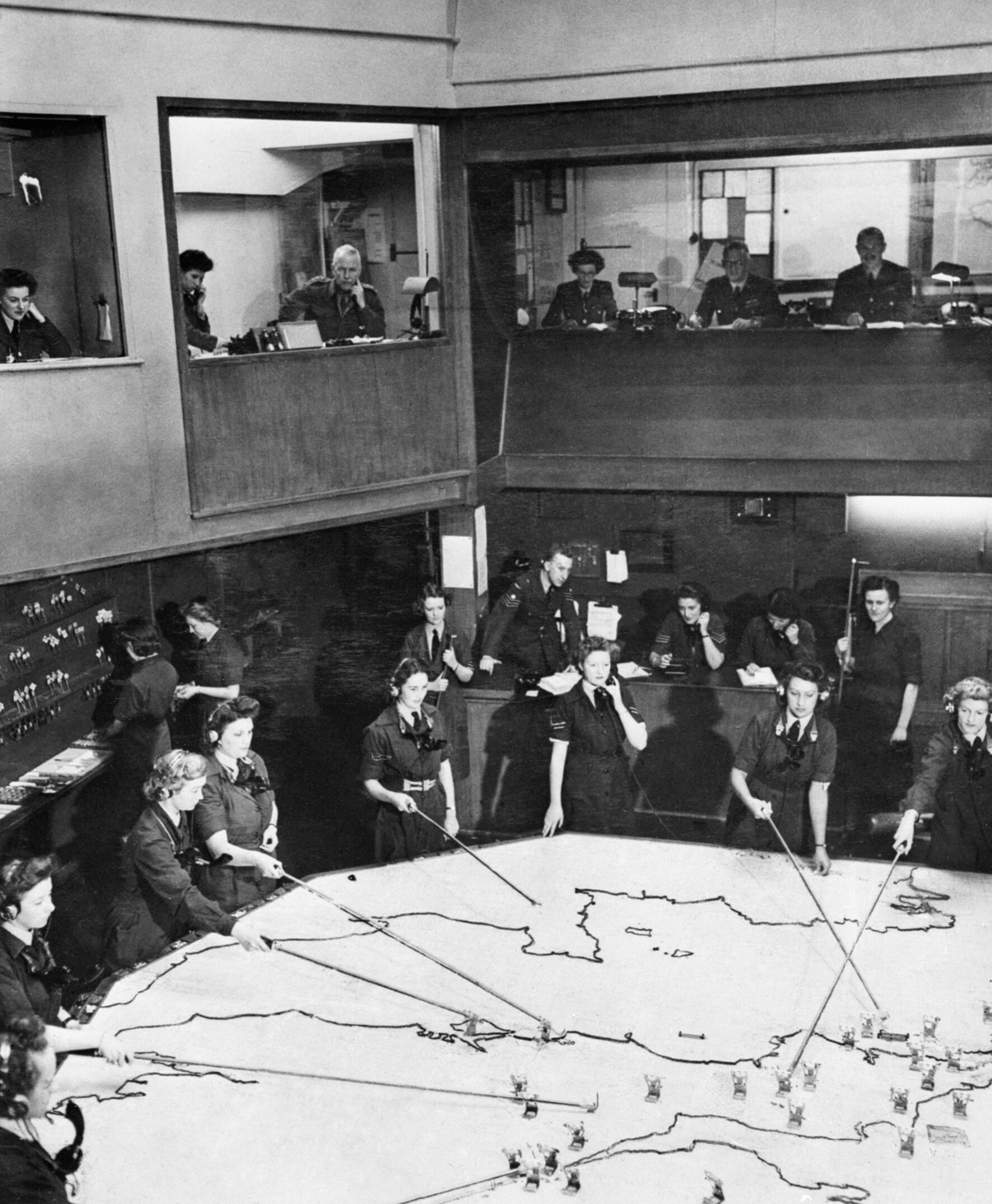
The Operations Room at RAF Fighter Command's No. 10 Group Headquarters, RAF Rudloe Manor (RAF Box), Wiltshire, showing WAAF plotters and duty officers at work, 1943

When the WAAF was established 10 roles were available: driver; cook; clerk; mess orderly; equipment assistant; fabric worker; teleprinter operator; telephonist; plotter; radio operator. WAAFs did not serve as aircrew, with the use of women pilots being limited to the Air Transport Auxiliary (ATA), which was civilian organisation, but 30 WAAFs did transfer to serve as pilots in the ATA. As the war progressed more officer branches and airwomen trades were opened up to WAAF personnel due to shortages in male officers and aircraftmen, where at the end of the war there were 24 branches for WAAF officers, and 93 trades for airwomen. These additional roles included the crewing of barrage balloons, radar operation, aircraft maintenance, transport, meteorology, and policing.

WAAFs were a vital presence in the control of aircraft, both in radar stations and iconically as plotters in operation rooms, most notably during the Battle of Britain. These operation rooms directed fighter aircraft against the Luftwaffe, mapping both home and enemy aircraft positions.

Although WAAFs did not participate in active combat, they were exposed to the same dangers as any on the "home front" working at military installations, such as the bombing raids at Biggin Hill.

Additionally WAAFs worked in intelligence operations, working with codes and cyphers, analysing reconnaissance photographs, with several WAAFs also being selected to engage in special reconnaissance and espionage as part of the Special Operations Executive.

From 1940, WAAF officers could serve overseas, and from 1943 aircraftwomen began serving overseas as well.

While the official terminology for the WAAF at barrage balloon sites was barrage balloon operator, they were often referred to in the press as the balloon girls.

Air Force nurses belonged to Princess Mary's Royal Air Force Nursing Service instead. Female medical and dental officers were commissioned into the Royal Air Force and held RAF ranks.

WAAFs were paid two-thirds of the pay of male counterparts in RAF ranks.

=== Flying Nightingales ===
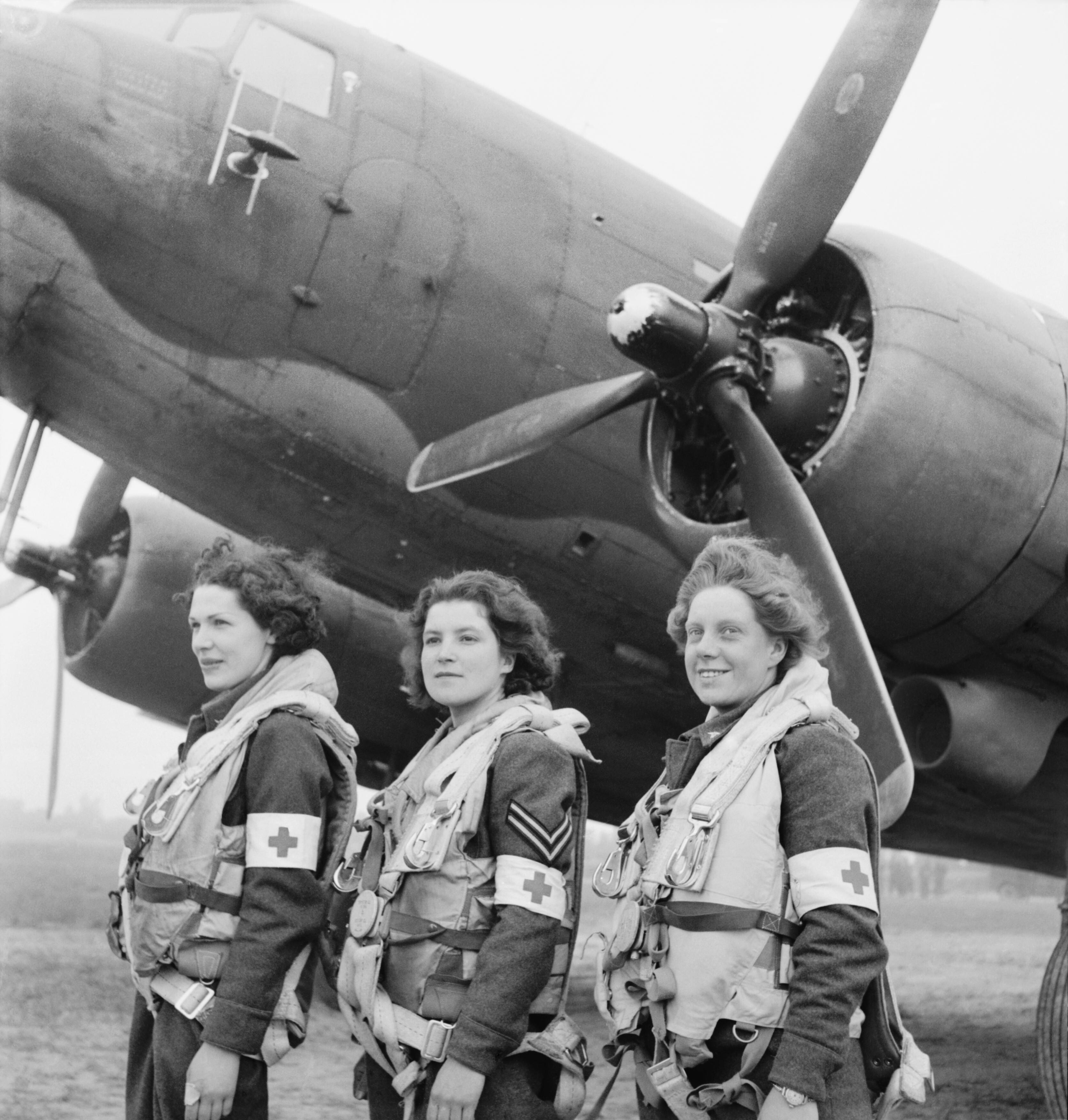
Leading aircraftwoman Myra Roberts, corporal Lydia Alford and leading aircraftwoman Edna Birkbeck, the first WAAF nursing orderlies selected to fly on air-ambulance duties to France, 1944

Nursing Orderlies of the WAAF flew on RAF transport planes to evacuate the wounded from the Normandy battlefields. They were dubbed the Flying Nightingales by the press. The RAF Air Ambulance Unit flew under 46 Group Transport Command from RAF Down Ampney, RAF Broadwell, and RAF Blakehill Farm. RAF Dakota aircraft carried military supplies and ammunition so could not display the Red Cross.

Training for air ambulance nursing duties included instruction in the use of oxygen, injections, learning how to deal with certain types of injuries such as broken bones, missing limb cases, head injuries, burns and colostomies; and to learn the effects of air travel and altitude. Although supplied with parachutes, they were instructed not to use them if the plane was shot down on its return from Europe and instead stay with the wounded soldiers onboard and provide medical support should anyone survive the crash.

The first three Flying Nightingales to arrive in France, a week after D-Day, were corporal Lydia Alford, leading aircraftwoman Myra Roberts and leading aircraftwoman Edna Birkbeck.

In October 2008 the seven known nurses still living were presented with lifetime achievement awards by the Duchess of Cornwall.

== Directors ==
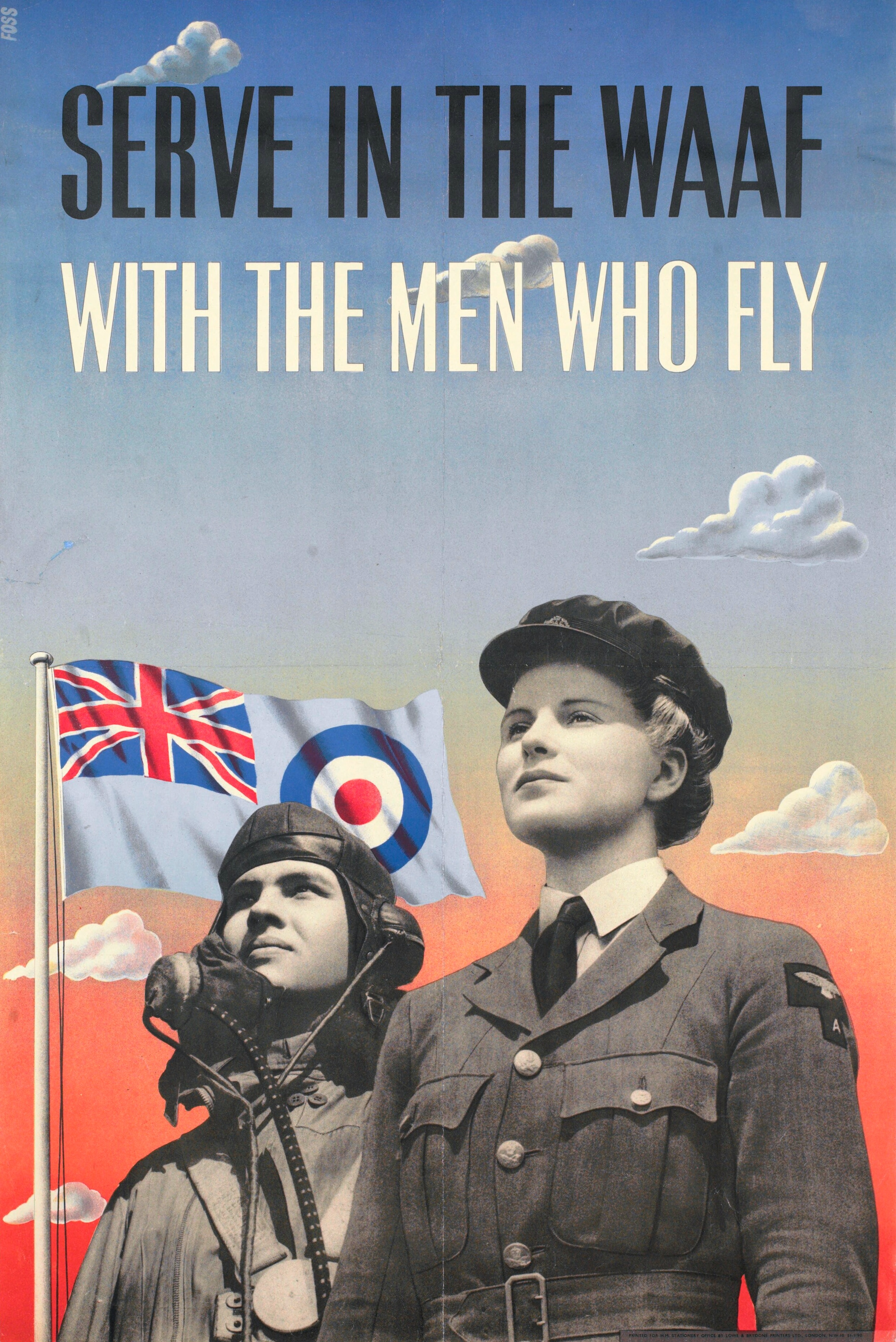
WAAF Recruitment poster, 1941

On 1 July 1939, Jane Trefusis Forbes was made director of WAAF, with the rank of senior controller, later, air Commandant. On 1 January 1943 she was appointed to the rank of air chief commandant with its creation. On 4 October 1943, while Forbes toured Canada, assessing the Royal Canadian Air Force Women's Division, she was relieved by Princess Alice, Duchess of Gloucester, who had been commandant of the WAAF since 1939, again with the rank of Senior Controller, then, air Commandant, being gazetted to air chief commandant on 4 March 1943. The post of director was given to Mary Welsh, who was appointed air chief commandant. Forbes later retired in August 1944. After the war, the rank of air chief commandant was suspended and in October 1946, the final director of WAAF, Felicity Hanbury, was appointed.

Director of the Women's Auxiliary Air Force
Image	Name	Rank	Years
	Jane Trefusis Forbes	Senior controller	1 July 1939–January 1940
	Jane Trefusis Forbes	Air commandant	January 1940–1 January 1943
	Jane Trefusis Forbes	Air chief commandant	1 January 1943–4 October 1943
	Mary Welsh	Air chief commandant	4 October 1943–November 1946
	Felicity Hanbury	Air commandant	12 October 1946–January 1949

Commandant of the Women's Auxiliary Air Force
Image	Name	Rank	Years
	Princess Alice, Duchess of Gloucester	Senior controller	1939–12 March 1940
	Princess Alice, Duchess of Gloucester	Air commandant	12 March 1940–4 March 1943
	Princess Alice, Duchess of Gloucester	Air chief commandant	4 March 1943–August 1944

== Ranks ==
Initially, the WAAF used the ATS ranking system, although the director held the rank of senior controller (equivalent to brigadier in the British Army and air commodore in the RAF) instead of chief controller (equivalent to major-general or air vice-marshal) as in the ATS. While the rank names were different, the rank insignia used were the same as those used by the RAF. In December 1939 the title of senior controller was changed to air commandant, when all ranks in the WAAF were renamed and reorganised. Other ranks now held identical ranks to male RAF personnel, but officers continued to have a separate rank system, although now different from that of the ATS. From February 1940 it was no longer possible to enter directly as an officer; from that time all officers were appointed from the other ranks. From July 1941 WAAF officers held full commissions. On 1 January 1943, the rank of air chief commandant (equivalent to air vice-marshal) was created with the director's appointment to that rank.

=== Officers ===
Rank group	Air officers					Field officers			Junior officers
Women's Auxiliary Air Force (1939–1940)
Women's Auxiliary Air Force (1939–1940)					Senior controller	Controller	Chief commandant	Senior commandant	Company commander	Deputy company commander	Company assistant
Women's Auxiliary Air Force (1940–1949)
Women's Auxiliary Air Force (1940–1949)				Air Chief Commandant (Note: created 1943 with first appointment.)	Air Commandant	Group Officer	Wing Officer	Squadron Officer	Flight Officer	Section Officer	Assistant Section Officer
Royal Air Force
Royal Air Force	Marshal of the RAF	Air chief marshal	Air marshal	Air vice-marshal	Air commodore	Group captain	Wing commander	Squadron leader	Flight lieutenant	Flying officer	Pilot officer /acting pilot officer
NATO code	OF-10	OF-9	OF-8	OF-7	OF-6	OF-5	OF-4	OF-3	OF-2	OF-1

=== Other ranks ===
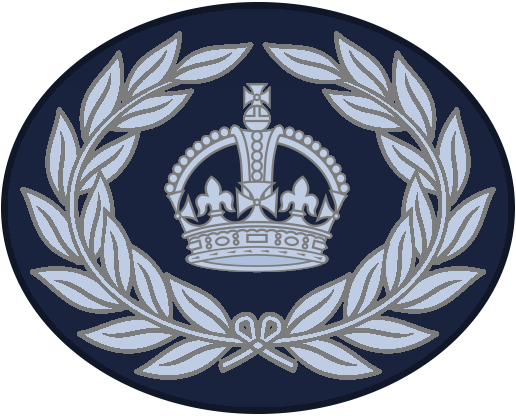
Rank group	Senior NCOs					Junior NCOs		Enlisted
Women's Auxiliary Air Force (1939–1940)									No insignia
Women's Auxiliary Air Force (1939–1940)			Senior Section Leader	Section Leader		Assistant Section Leader			Aircraftwoman 1st Class	Aircraftwoman 2nd Class
Women's Auxiliary Air Force (1940–1942)									No insignia
Women's Auxiliary Air Force (1940–1942)	Under officer		Senior sergeant	Sergeant		Corporal			Aircraftwoman 1st Class	Aircraftwoman 2nd Class
Women's Auxiliary Air Force (1942–1949)									No insignia
Women's Auxiliary Air Force (1942–1949)	Warrant officer		Flight Sergeant (Note: also called Senior Sergeant)	Sergeant		Corporal		Leading Aircraftwoman	Aircraftwoman 1st Class	Aircraftwoman 2nd Class
Royal Air Force (1939–1950)									No insignia
Royal Air Force (1939–1950)	Warrant officer		Flight sergeant	Sergeant		Corporal		Leading aircraftman	Aircraftman 1st class	Aircraftman 2nd class
NATO code	OR-9	OR-8	OR-7	OR-6	OR-5	OR-4	OR-3	OR-2		OR-1

== Notable members of WAAF ==
=== WAAFs serving with SOE ===
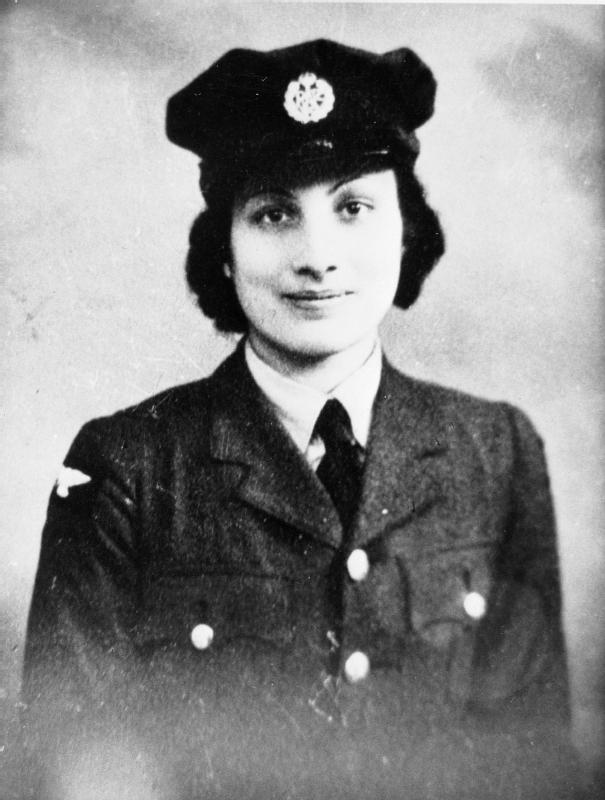
Noor Inayat Khan in WAAF uniform, 1943

Several members of the WAAF served with the Special Operations Executive during the Second World War.

- Assistant section officer Noor Inayat Khan (9901), posthumously Mentioned in Dispatches and awarded the French Croix de Guerre with Gold Star and the George Cross, Britain's highest award for gallantry not in the face of the enemy.
- Section officer Yvonne Baseden
- Section officer Yolande Beekman, posthumously awarded the French Croix de Guerre.
- Assistant section officer Sonya Butt (9910)
- Section officer Muriel Byck
- Flight officer Yvonne Cormeau, awarded the MBE, Croix de Guerre, the Légion d'honneur, and the Médaille combattant volontaire de la Résistance.
- Flight officer Alix D'Unienville
- Flight officer Krystyna Skarbek (aka Christine Granville), awarded the OBE, George Medal and Croix de Guerre.
- Section officer Mary Katherine Herbert
- Section officer Phyllis Latour, awarded the MBE and the Croix de Guerre.
- Section officer Cecily Lefort, posthumously awarded the French Croix de Guerre.
- Section officer Patricia O'Sullivan, awarded the MBE and the Croix de Guerre.
- Sergeant Haviva Reik (aka Ada Robinson)
- Assistant section officer Lilian Rolfe, posthumously awarded the MBE and the Croix de Guerre.
- Section officer Diana Rowden, posthumously awarded the MBE and the Croix de Guerre.
- Section officer Anne-Marie Walters, awarded the MBE.

=== Other notable WAAFs ===
- Section leader Constance Babington Smith, imagery intelligence specialist, first to identify launch ramps for V-1 flying bomb. Awarded MBE.
- Sarah Churchill, photographic interpreter, daughter of then prime minister Winston Churchill.

== Gallery ==
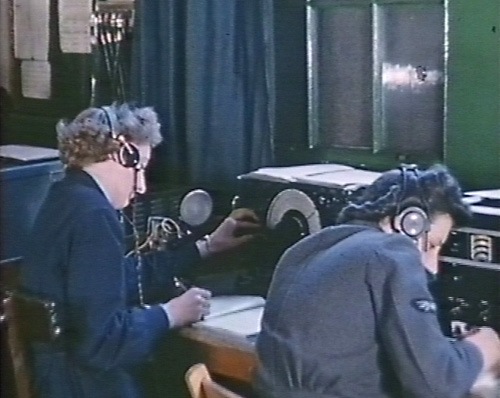
WAAF Operation Corona Radio Operators

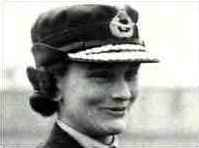
Princess Alice, Duchess of Gloucester, Commandant of the WAAF, 1944

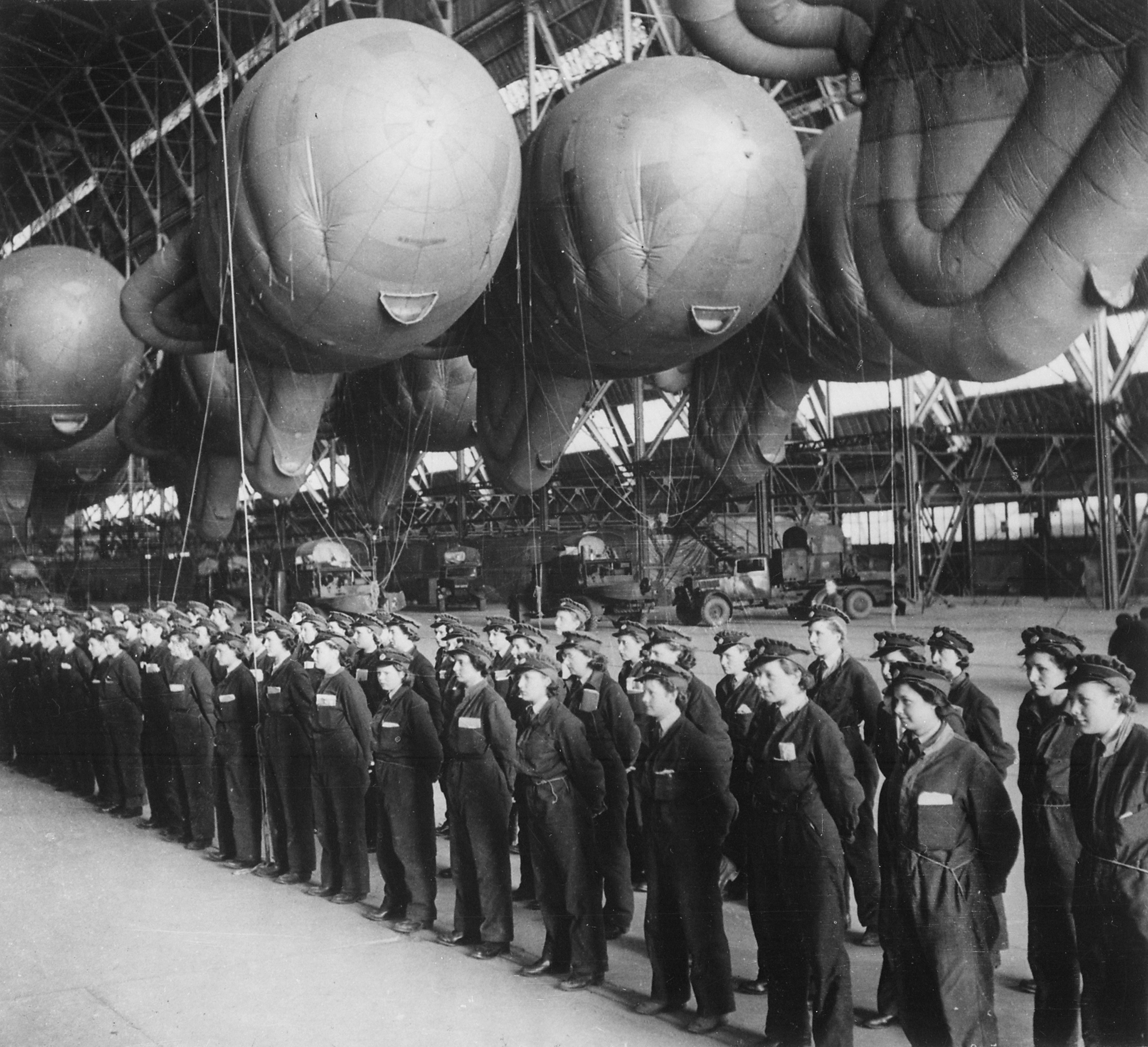
WAAF Barrage Balloon crews at RAF Cardington.

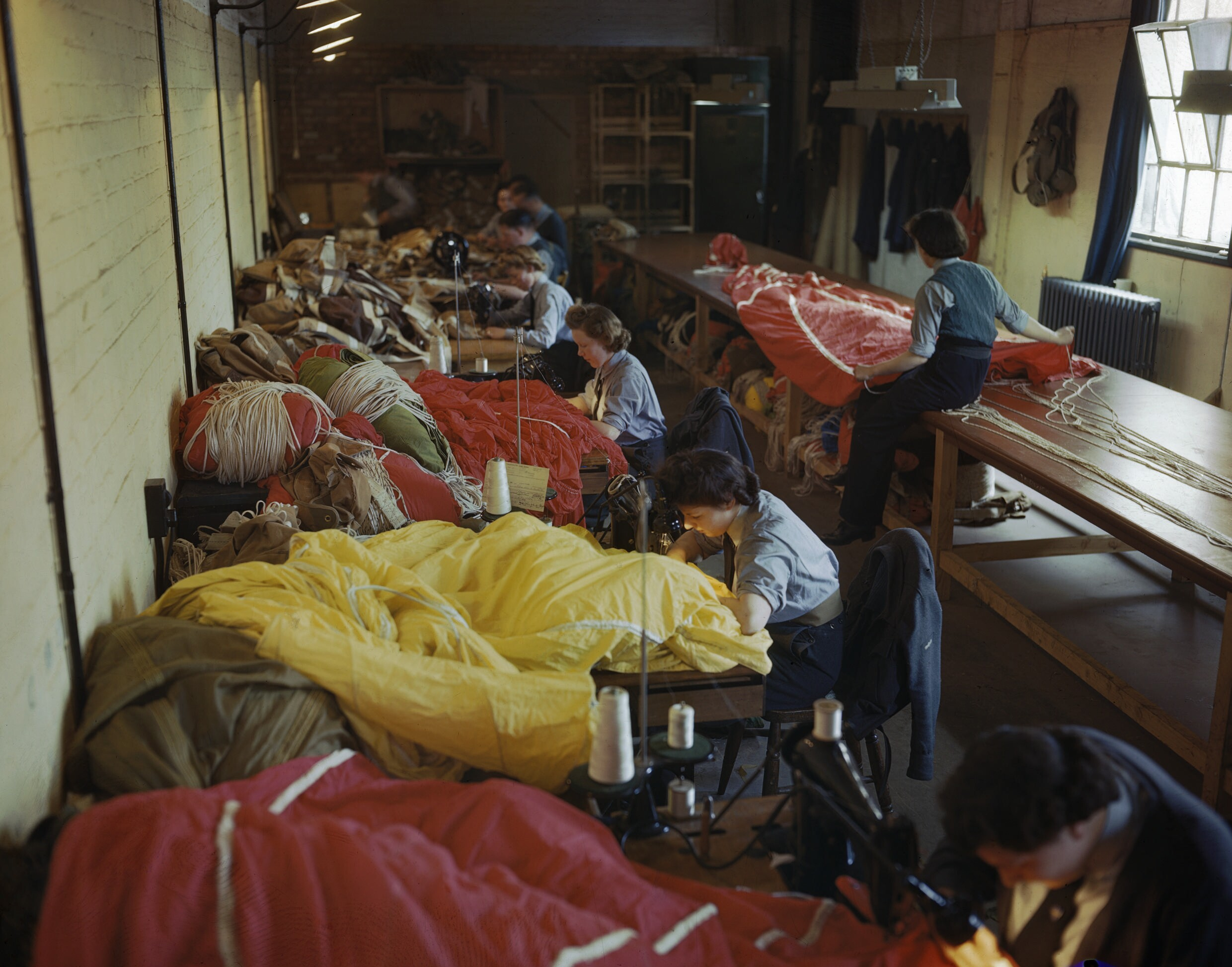
Members of the WAAF repair and pack parachutes for use by airborne troops during the Normandy invasion, 31 May 1944.

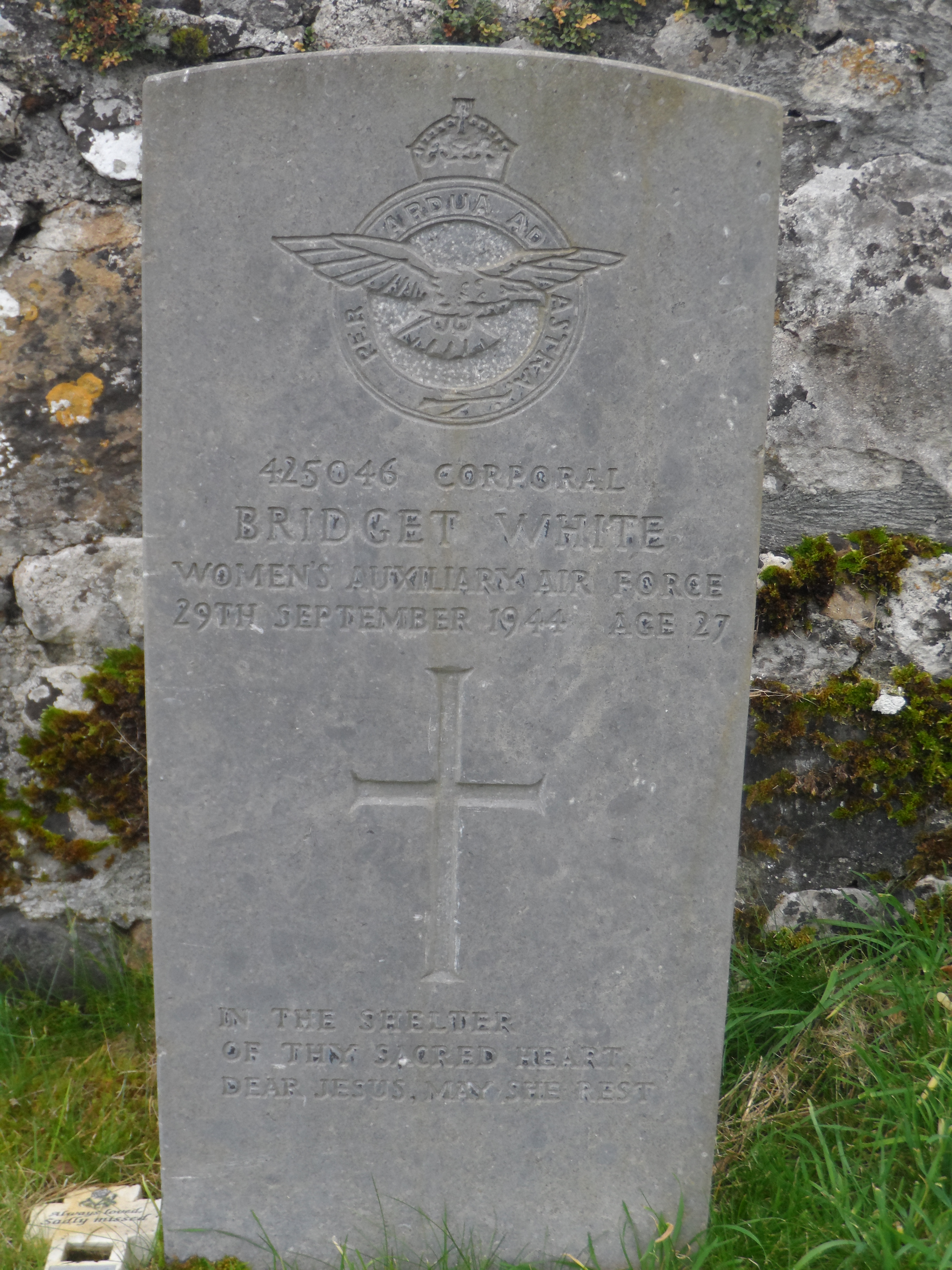
Grave of an Irish WAAF corporal Bridget White, in Clonmacnoise. White was serving with the No3 (Pilots) Advanced Flying Unit based at RAF South Cerney when she died in a road accident.

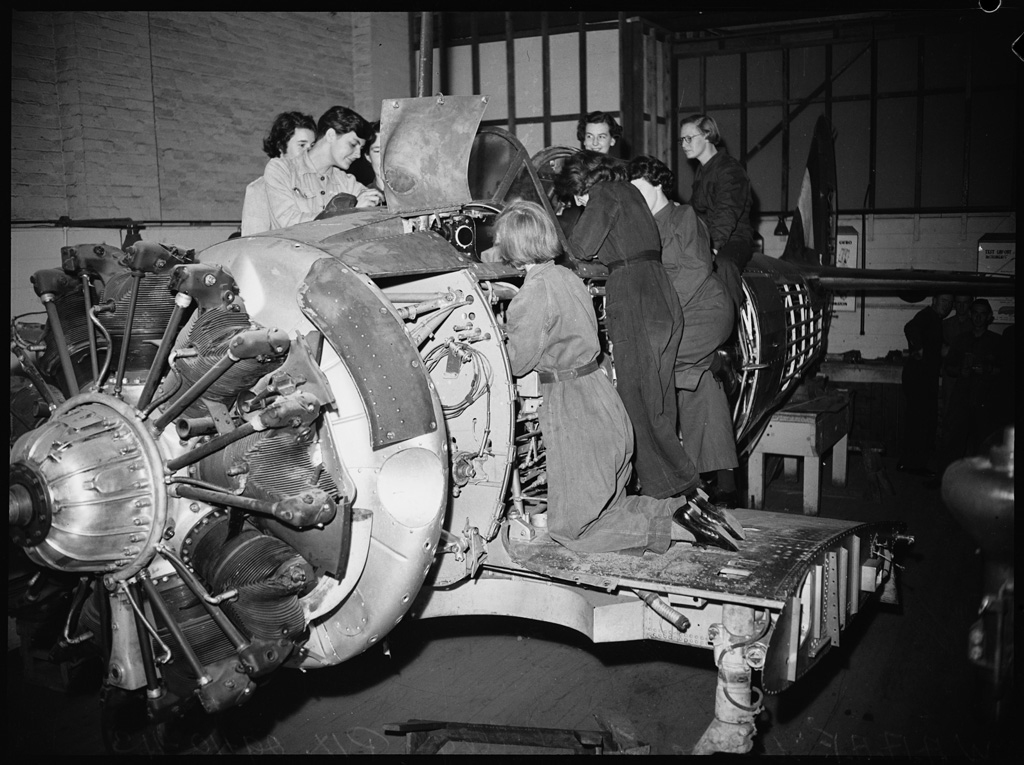
WAAFs working on an aircraft fuselage at Ultimo Technical College, Sydney, 1943

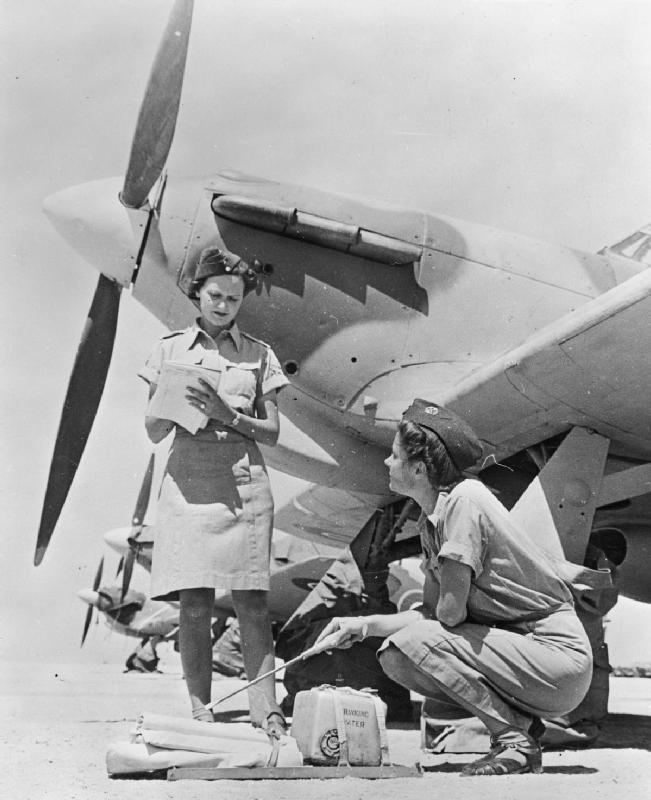
WAAFs check the desert survival kit of a Hawker Hurricane for a maintenance unit in the Middle East

== See also ==
- Air Transport Auxiliary
- Auxiliary Territorial Service
- National Association of Training Corps for Girls
- Women Airforce Service Pilots (US)
- Women's Army Corps (US)
- Women's Auxiliary Australian Air Force
- Women's Royal Naval Service
- Military ranks of women's services in WWII
