= Jane Trefusis Forbes =

Dame Jane Trefusis Forbes
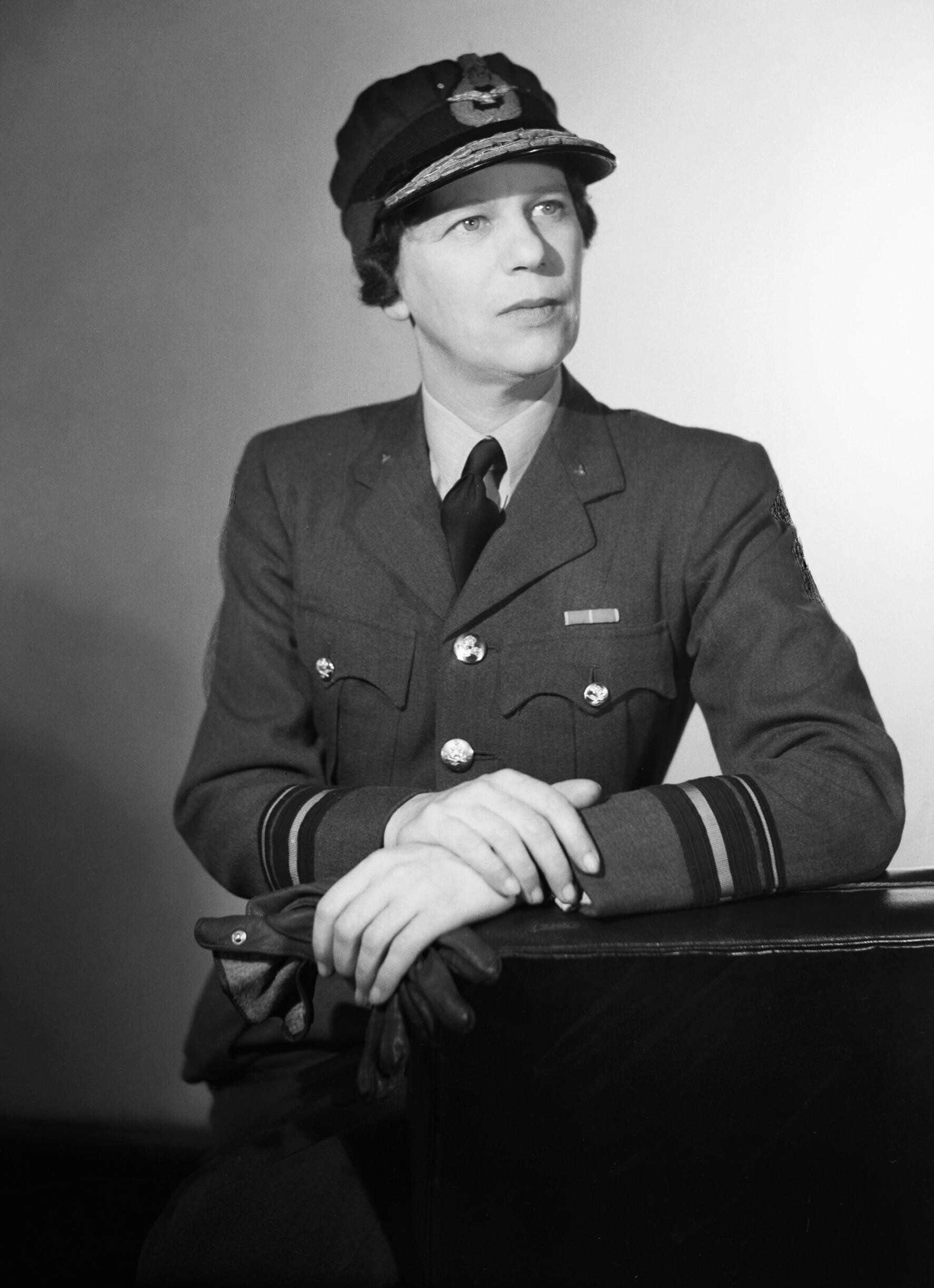
- Jane Trefusis Forbes as Air Chief Commandant (1943)
- Born: Katherine Jane Trefusis Forbes; 21 March 1899; Taltal, Chile
- Died: 18 June 1971 (aged 72); London, England
- Burial place: Holy Trinity Episcopal Churchyard, Pitlochry
- Spouse: Sir Robert Watson-Watt
- Relatives: James David Forbes (grandfather)
- Military career
- Allegiance: United Kingdom
- Branch: Women's Auxiliary Air Force
- Service years: 1939–1943
- Rank: Air Chief Commandant
- Commands: Women's Auxiliary Air Force (1939–43)
- Conflicts: Second World War
- Awards: Dame Commander of the Order of the British Empire

Air Chief Commandant Dame Katherine Jane Trefusis Forbes, Lady Watson-Watt, DBE (21 March 1899 – 18 June 1971), known as Jane Trefusis Forbes, was a businesswoman and the first director of the Women's Auxiliary Air Force (1939–43).

== Career ==
Jane Trefusis Forbes had been Chief Instructor, Auxiliary Territorial Service School of Instruction in 1938. In 1936, Forbes, Helen Gwynne-Vaughan and Kitty Trenchard launched the Emergency Service, to train women and organise them to be prepared in case of war. There were probably fewer than 100 women in the organisation, which was not officially recognized. On 1 July 1939, three months before the beginning of the Second World War, she was appointed as Director of the WAAF in order "to advise the Air Member for Personnell [sic] on questions concerning the WAAF".

Trefusis Forbes inherited "The Observatory" in Pitlochry in 1936, upon the death of her uncle, the physicist George Forbes. Early in the war she is said to have allowed the house to be used as a place for senior militarily personnel to have a few days respite – Field Marshal Sir Bernard Montgomery is thought to have been among the guests. By 1943 there were 175,000 women in the ranks of the WAAF. In October 1943, she toured Canada to assess the Women's Division of the Royal Canadian Air Force (RCAF). She also toured India to investigate the possibility of employing women in the South East Asia Command. She retired in August 1944.

== Honours ==
In January 1944, Trefusis Forbes was appointed a Dame Commander of the Order of the British Empire (DBE). She had always been known by her second name, Jane, but on discovering that it would cost her a half crown to change her first name in order to become Dame Jane she decided that she would become Dame Katherine.

== Personal life ==
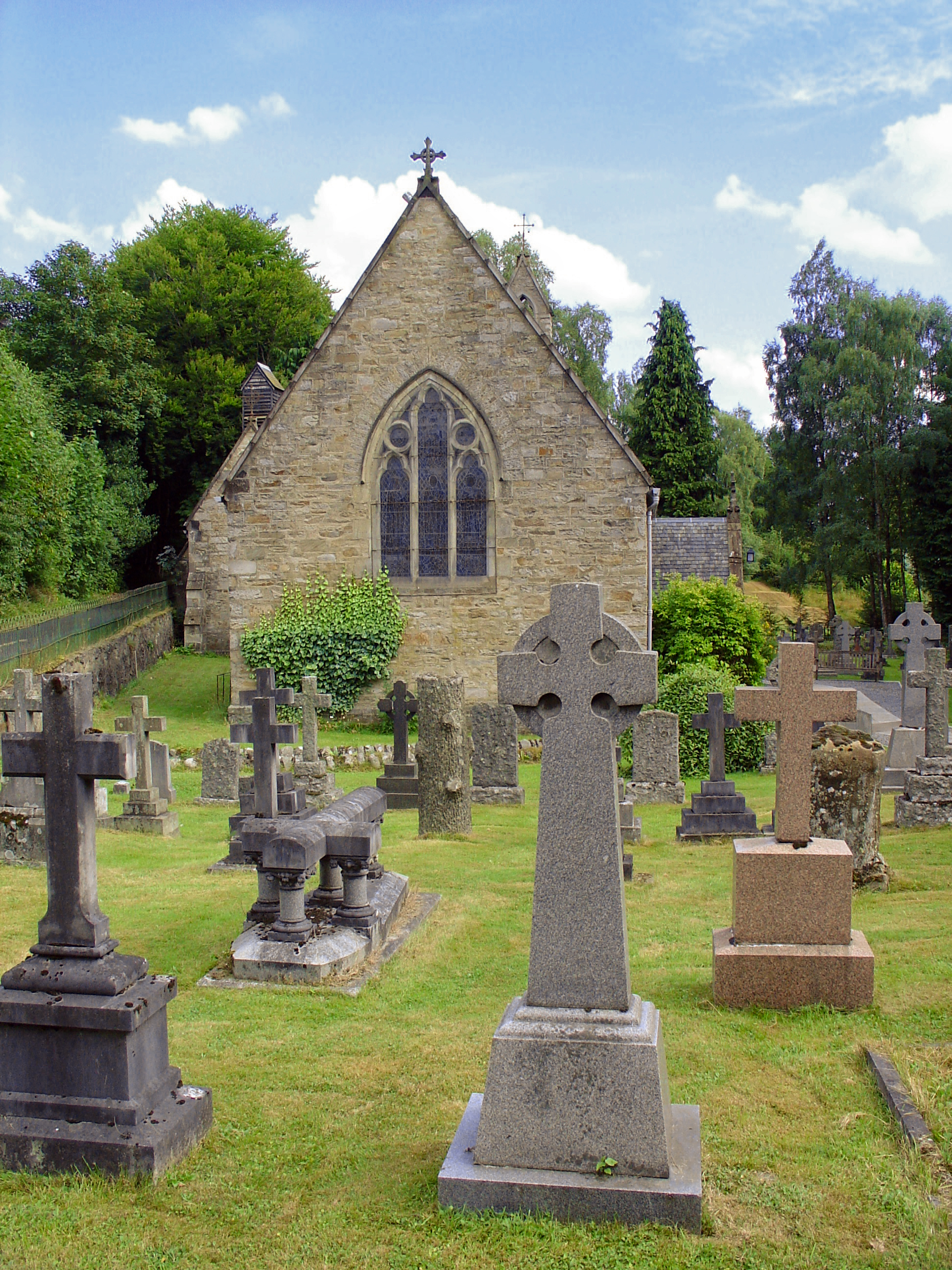
Holy Trinity Episcopal Churchyard at Pitlochry (2006)

The youngest of six children of Edmund Batten Forbes (1847–1924), a civil engineer, and his wife, Charlotte Catherine Agnes (née Wauchope; died 1958), Katherine Jane Trefusis Forbes was born in Chile, where her father, the son of James David Forbes, eminent physicist, glaciologist, and principal of the University of St Andrews, was an engineer building the railroad from the coast to the interior.

At one time engaged to a cousin who died mountaineering, she was unmarried until 1966, when she and Sir Robert Alexander Watson-Watt, who is credited with developing radar, married in London. They lived together in London in the winter, and at "The Observatory" (Trefusis Forbes' summer home) in Pitlochry, Scotland during the rest of the year. The couple met for the first time back during World War II when the WAAF was responsible for managing radar installations.

== Death ==
Lady Watson-Watt died in 1971 in London, aged 72, after suffering a second heart attack. Her husband died two years later. Both are interred in the churchyard at Pitlochry.
