= LV Corps =

LV Corps or 55th Corps may refer to:

- 55th Corps (German Empire)
- LV Army Corps, Wehrmacht, Germany
- 55th (Leigh) Lancashire Rifle Volunteer Corps, United Kingdom

== See also ==
- List of military corps by number
- 55th Army (disambiguation)
- 55th Brigade (disambiguation)
- 55th Division (disambiguation)
- 55th Regiment (disambiguation)
- 55th (disambiguation)
- LV (disambiguation)
