= 55th Army =

55th Army may refer to:

- Fifty-Fifth Army (Japan)
- 55th Army (Soviet Union)

== See also ==
- List of armies by number
- 55th Division (disambiguation)
- 55th Brigade (disambiguation)
- 55th Regiment (disambiguation)
- 55th (disambiguation)
