= 55 =

55 may refer to:

- 55 (number), the natural number following 54 and preceding 56
- 55 BC
- AD 55
- 1955
- 2055

== Science ==
- Caesium, by the element's atomic number

=== Astronomy ===
- Messier object M55, a magnitude 7.0 globular cluster in the constellation Sagittarius
- The New General Catalogue object NGC 55, a magnitude 7.9 barred spiral galaxy in the constellation Sculptor
- 55 Nights, mixtape by british rapper Future

== Transportation ==
- The highest speed limit allowed in the United States between 1974 and 1986 per the National Maximum Speed Law
- Highway 55, several roads
- Route 55 (disambiguation), bus and tram routes
- DAF 55, a small family car

== Film ==
- 55 Days at Peking, a film starring Charlton Heston and David Niven

== Other uses ==
- Gazeta 55, an Albanian newspaper
- Agitation and Propaganda against the State, also known as Constitution law 55, a law during Communist Albania
- +55, the code for international direct dial phone calls to Brazil
- 5:5, law enforcement code for handcuffs
- 55 (album), by the Knocks
- "55", a 2022 song by Raymix
- "55 (Hamsa oua Hamsine)", an instrumental by the Master Musicians of Joujouka from Brian Jones Presents the Pipes of Pan at Joujouka
- "Fifty Five", a song by Karma to Burn from the album Arch Stanton, 2014
- 55 Pandora, a main-belt asteroid

== See also ==
- 55th (disambiguation)
- 55th Regiment of Foot (disambiguation)
- Channel 55 (disambiguation)
- Type 55 (disambiguation)
- Class 55 (disambiguation)
