= 73rd Heavy Anti-Aircraft Regiment =

73rd Heavy Anti-Aircraft Regiment may refer to:

- 73rd Heavy Anti-Aircraft Regiment, Royal Artillery, a British Territorial Army unit formed in the West Midlands in 1937
- 73rd Heavy Anti-Aircraft Regiment (1947–55), a Regular British Army unit
