= 55th =

55th is the ordinal form of the number 55. 55th or Fifty-fifth may also refer to:

- A fraction, 1/55, equal to one of 55 equal parts

== Geography ==
- 55th meridian east, a line of longitude
- 55th meridian west, a line of longitude
- 55th parallel north, a circle of latitude
- 55th parallel south, a circle of latitude
- 55th Street (disambiguation)

== Military ==
- 55th Brigade (disambiguation)
- 55th Division (disambiguation)
- 55th Regiment (disambiguation)

== Other ==
- 55th century
- 55th century BC

== See also ==
- 55 (disambiguation)
