= X55 (disambiguation) =

X-55 is the Lockheed Martin X-55 aircraft.

X55, X.55, X-55, or variation may also refer to:

== Vehicles ==
=== Aviation ===
- Kh-55 (Russian: Х-55; also called "X-55"), Soviet air-launched cruise missile
- X-55 (UAV), an Armenian armed forces aerial drone

=== Automotive ===
- Senova X55, former name of the Beijing X5 compact crossover SUV
- MVM X55, a variant of the compact crossover SUV Chery Tiggo 5x
- Beijing Mofang, a Chinese compact crossover SUV sold in overseas markets as BAIC X55

=== Other ===
- SJ X55 Regina, a Swedish electric multiple unit train model
- X55, an X-Yachts sailing yacht

== Other uses ==
- Mid-Florida Airport (FAA id X55), Eustis, Florida, US; see List of airports in Florida
- Snapdragon X55 chipset; see List of Qualcomm Snapdragon modems
- Eika X55 synthesizer, a clonewheel organ
- X55, a copper-zinc brazing alloy

== See also ==
- U (Unicode entity U+0055, &#x55;)
- X5 (disambiguation)
- 55 (disambiguation)
- X (disambiguation)
