= 73rd Heavy Anti-Aircraft Regiment, Royal Artillery =

210 (Staffordshire) Battery, RA 73rd HAA Regiment, RA 473rd (North Midland) HAA Regiment, RA 444th (Staffordshire) LAA Regiment, RA
- Cap Badge of the Royal Artillery (pre-1953)
- Active: 1 October 1937–31 March 1945; 1 January 1947 – 10 March 1967; 1967–present
- Country: United Kingdom
- Branch: British Army
- Role: Air defence
- Size: Regiment
- Part of: Anti-Aircraft Command; Advanced Air Striking Force; Eighth Army
- Garrison/HQ: Wolverhampton; West Bromwich (1947–55)
- Engagements: Battle of France; Operation Aerial; The Blitz; Operation Husky; Italian Campaign

73rd Heavy Anti-Aircraft Regiment, Royal Artillery was a West Midlands-based volunteer air defence unit of Britain's Territorial Army (TA) raised in 1937. During World War II, it served in the Battle of France, The Blitz, Egypt, Sicily and Italy. Postwar, its successor regiments continued to serve until 1967, and a battery descended from the regiment forms part of today's Army Reserve

== Origins ==
In the late 1930s, the need for improved anti-aircraft (AA) defences for Britain's cities became apparent, and a programme of converting existing TA units was pushed forward. 73rd Anti-Aircraft Brigade Royal Artillery was formed at Wolverhampton on 1 October 1937. The Regimental Headquarters (RHQ) was formed from that of the former 54th (Durham and West Riding) Medium Brigade at York, which was being broken up; 204 (Warwickshire) Battery was transferred from 51st (Midland) Medium Brigade, and two Staffordshire batteries came from 62nd (North Midland) Field Regiment, giving the following organisation:

- RHQ at West Park, Wolverhampton
- 204 (Warwickshire) AA Battery at Saltley, Birmingham
- 209 (Wolverhampton) AA Battery at West Park
- 210 (West Bromwich) AA Battery at Carter's Green, West Bromwich

On 1 January 1939, the RA replaced the destination 'brigade' with regiment' for its AA units. Later that year, 204 AA Battery was transferred as an experienced cadre to help form the new 95th (Birmingham) AA Regt and was replaced by a newly raised 311 AA Battery formed at Brierley Hill on 1 April.

== World War II ==
=== Mobilisation ===
The TA's AA units were mobilised on 23 September 1938 during the Munich Crisis, with units manning their emergency positions within 24 hours, even though many did not yet have their full complement of men or equipment. The emergency lasted three weeks, and they were stood down on 13 October. In February 1939, the existing AA defences came under the control of a new Anti-Aircraft Command. In June, a partial mobilisation of TA units was begun in a process known as 'couverture', whereby each AA unit did a month's tour of duty in rotation to man selected AA and searchlight positions. On 24 August, ahead of the declaration of war, AA Command was fully mobilised at its war stations.

On the outbreak of war, 73rd AA Rgt under the command of Lieutenant-Colonel A.L. Wood, MC, TD, formed part of 34th (South Midland) Anti-Aircraft Brigade based at Coventry in 4 AA Division, but in November 1939 it deployed to France with the British Expeditionary Force.

=== Battle of France ===
When the Battle of France began in May 1940, 73rd HAA Rgt was part of 12 AA Bde defending the airfields of the RAF Advanced Air Striking Force (AASF) with semi-mobile 3-inch guns of 1918 pattern. The regiment was deployed to defend some of the southern airfields: Lt-Col Wood with RHQ was at Chouilly, east of Épernay, 209 AA Bty with eight guns was at Écury and Athis, 311 AA Bty's eight guns were distributed to Matougues, Saint-Mard-lès-Rouffy and Le Mesnil-sur-Oger, while 210 AA Bty was detached to 2 AA Bde covering airfields north of the River Somme (see below). The first GL Mk. I gunlaying radar sets had arrived amidst much secrecy.

The AASF airfields came under attack at the start of the campaign, subjected to dive-bombing and low-level attacks with which the old 3-inch guns and their Vickers Predictor No 1 and height-finders could not cope. Soon, the AASF had to send depleted squadrons back to the UK, and reorganise as a mobile force to withdraw in front of the advancing Germans, while its bombers continued to attack enemy communications.

The German Blitzkrieg attack soon cut off the bulk of the BEF's fighting formations and forced them to withdraw to Dunkirk for evacuation to England. However, even after the Dunkirk evacuation ended at the beginning of June, the AASF, a number of fighting formations and a large number of rear echelon units were still in France south of the Somme, and fresh British forces were being landed at Cherbourg. 12 AA Brigade set off to join this new concentration, its regiments 'trundling their old 3-inch guns at their maximum speed of 10 to 12 mph, though Vendôme, Le Mans and Rennes on the long haul westwards'.

However, the situation in France was beyond remedy, and the British government decided to evacuate its remaining troops from the Atlantic ports between 15 and 17 June (Operation Aerial). Detachments of 73rd HAA Rgt maintained temporary cover for 72 hours along the route of the evacuation, and two of its precious GL radar sets were got away from Saint-Nazaire by 79th (Hertfordshire Yeomanry) HAA Rgt, but the rest of the equipment had to be destroyed on the dockside. Personnel embarked under attack by the Luftwaffe and the RMS Lancastria, with some parties of 73rd HAA Rgt aboard, was sunk off Saint-Nazaire with heavy loss of life.

=== 210 Battery ===
In April 1940, 210 AA Bty was detached to 2 AA Bde, which was responsible for defending the airfields of the BEF's Air Component north of the Somme. The battery deployed six 3-inch guns at Mons-en-Chaussee and two at Peronne Civil Airport under the command of 60th (City of London) AA Rgt. However, 210 Bty only had two gun tractors for these semi-mobile guns. Each airfield was also defended by a Troop from 8 Bty of 2nd Searchlight Rgt.

Once the Germans had broken through, 210 Bty was ordered to reposition on 16–17 May, with Bty HQ (BHQ), a four-gun Trp and a S/L Trp at Conteville airfield, and the other gun and S/L Trps at Crécy airfield. They were in position on 18 May the day that Peronne fell to the Germans.

By now, the RAF's fighter squadrons were withdrawing from France and on 20 May 210 Bty, accompanied by the two Trps of 8 S/L Bty, was ordered to withdraw from Conteville and Crecy. 2nd S/L Regiment lent towing vehicles to get the guns away. Initially, they were ordered to Saint-Pol, then to Saint-Omer and finally to move south-west to Rouen to come under 3 AA Bde. However, 2nd Panzer Division was already in Abbeville blocking the way, and the battery had to fight a rearguard action with enemy ground troops to get to the coast at Boulogne. Although it had to abandon its guns, they had been disabled and the battery had got away with all the instruments and breechblocks. One officer and eight other ranks had been lost in the rearguard action. The battery left Boulogne before it came under attack and made it back to Dunkirk, where the BEF was preparing its evacuation (Operation Dynamo). On 26 May, 210 Bty was ordered back to the UK to reform.

=== Blitz ===
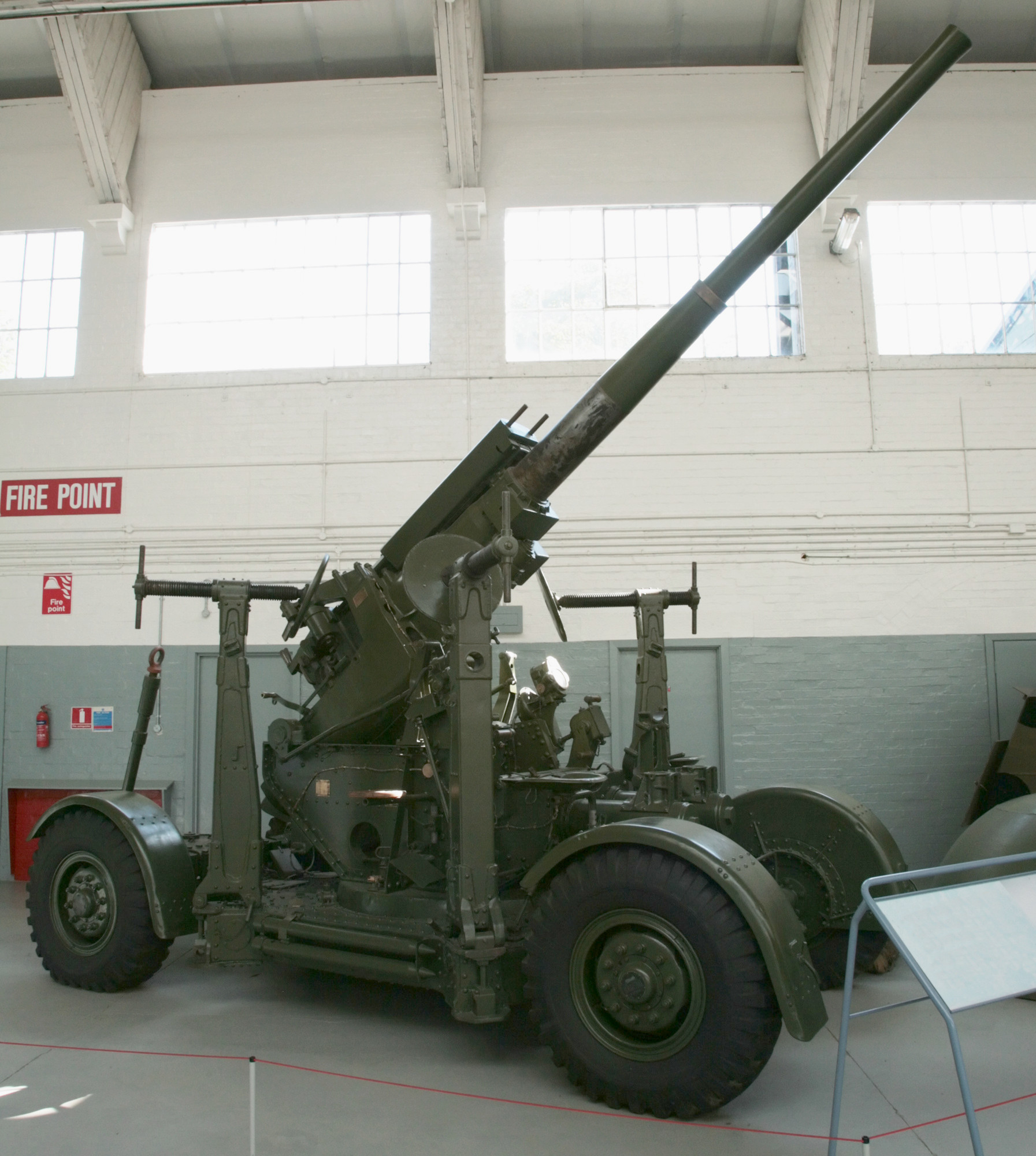
3.7-inch HAA gun preserved at Imperial War Museum Duxford.

AA units evacuated from France were rapidly reinforced, re-equipped where possible, and redeployed for future integration into existing defence plans. 73rd AA Regiment, with 209, 210 and 311 Btys under command, went to No 1 AA Practice Camp, Aberporth, where it re-equipped with 3.7-inch guns. On 1 June, those AA regiments equipped with 3-inch or the newer 3.7-inch were termed Heavy Anti-Aircraft (HAA) to distinguish them from the new Light Anti-Aircraft (LAA) units being formed.

After re-equipping, the regiment was posted to 43 AA Bde in 7 AA Division tasked with guarding Middlesbrough during the Blitz.

In late May 1941, the regiment transferred to 42 AA Bde defending Clydeside in 12 AA Division, and then left AA Command entirely during the summer to join the War Office Reserve to train for overseas service.

=== Egypt ===
The regiment arrived in Egypt with 209, 210 and 311 HAA Btys early in 1942 and served in Middle East Forces. It remained defending base areas in Egypt throughout the North African Campaign. In early 1943, its 24 3.7-inch guns were deployed under 18 AA Bde in Eighth Army defending Alexandria, Aboukir, Matruh and the landing grounds of the Desert Air Force.

=== Operation Husky ===
The regiment concentrated at Suez in June 1943 to prepare for the Allied invasion of Sicily (Operation Husky). For this operation, eight composite beach groups were formed to defend the landing points as soon as possible after Zero Hour, each of which included an HAA Bty organised on a light scale for assault landing. The availability of Landing Ships, Tank (LSTs) made it feasible to land suitably waterproofed 3.7-inch guns and GL radar sets in the first wave of the attack. The HAA Troops were equipped with a new GL radar system, the No 3 Mark III, or 'Baby Maggie', which had its transmitter, receiver, aerial array and operating display all carried in a two-wheeled trailer towed by a 3-ton truck. 209 and 311 HAA Batteries were each assigned to one of these beach groups and sailed from Egypt to take part in the landings.

The assault landings began at 02.45 on 10 July 1943. The advance parties of the AA units attached to the beach groups landed from Landing Craft Infantry (LCIs) as infantry prepared for a firefight, but there was only light opposition and they were soon able to move to the sites selected for gun positions when the LSTs arrived about 4 hours later, although the 'Baby Maggies' had failed to stand up to the rough handling of the landings. More importantly, radio communications with the AA HQ ship broke down for the first 48 hours after landing, and defensive fire was reduced to crude 'barrage' methods. The rest of 73rd HAA Rgt arrived at Syracuse on 13 July with the Tactical HQ of 2 AA Bde. After the landings, Eighth Army made rapid progress up the east coast of Sicily and the follow-up AA forces began to land. 62 AA Bde HQ arrived in Syracuse on 17 July, taking over responsibility for the port's defence.

=== Italy ===
While the Eighth Army invaded mainland Italy in September (Operation Baytown), 73rd HAA Rgt remained at Syracuse waiting to join it. It appears to have crossed to the mainland briefly, but by January 1944 it was back in Sicily guarding Augusta under 73 AA Bde. It finally moved to Italy, leaving Augusta on 7 October arriving at San Stefano on 20 October, and joining 66 AA Bde.

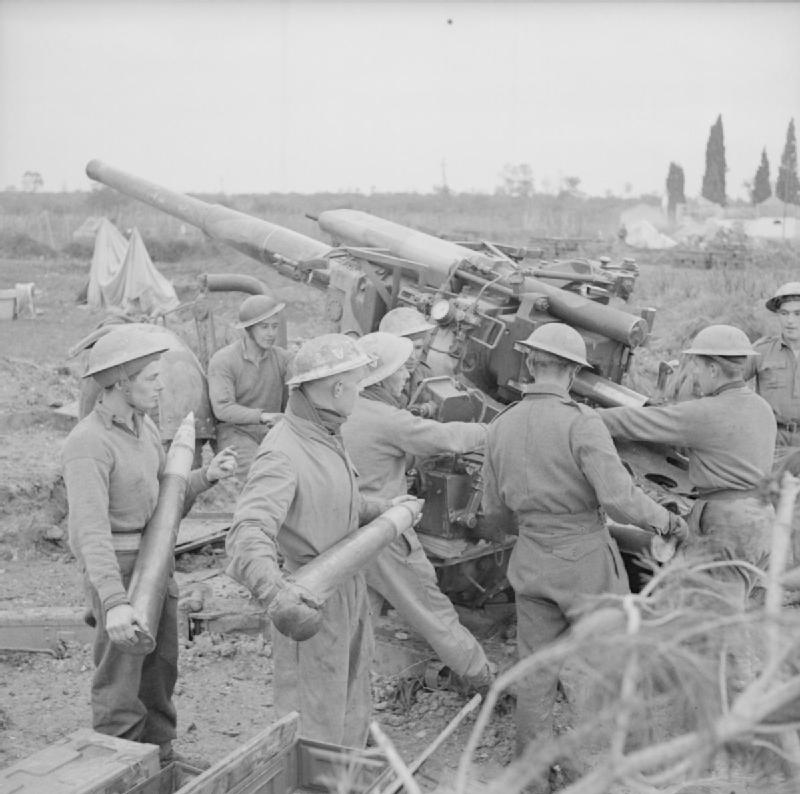
3.7-inch HAA gun in action in the field artillery role in Italy.

66 AA Brigade was providing AA defence for Leghorn (Livorno), which was Fifth US Army's main supply base. However, there was little Luftwaffe activity apart from occasional high-level reconnaissance aircraft flying over the port. By January 1945, the regiment had rejoined 62 AA Bde, which was close up to Fifth Army's positions facing the Gothic Line. With little call for AA defence, 62 AA Bde employed its versatile long-range 3.7-inch guns in a medium artillery role against ground targets. This included counter-battery (CB), defensive fire (DF) and harassing fire (HF) shoots, but also air-burst shoots against entrenched positions, and destruction of hard targets such as buildings.

By now, the Allied forces in Italy were suffering an acute manpower shortage, and surplus AA units were being disbanded in increasing numbers. On 14 January 1945, the regiment was told that it was to be placed in suspended animation. Most of the personnel were reassigned by mid-February and the process was completed by 31 March.

== Postwar ==
When the TA was reconstituted in 1947, the regiment reformed as 473rd (Mobile) HAA Regt (North Midland), with its HQ at West Bromwich in 74 AA Bde (the wartime 48 AA Bde, based in Stoke-on-Trent). (Note: A new and unrelated 73rd HAA Rgt was formed in 1947 from the war-service personnel of 55th (Kent) HAA Rgt.)

AA Command was disbanded on 10 March 1955 and there were wholesale amalgamations amongst its units. 473rd HAA Regiment merged with 643rd LAA Regiment (formerly the 1/6th Battalion of the South Staffordshire Regiment at Wolverhampton) in a new 444th Light Anti-Aircraft Regiment:

- RHQ at Wolverhampton
- P (Wolverhampton) Bty (from 473 HAA)
- Q (West Bromwich) Bty (from 473 HAA)
- R (South Staffs) Bty (from 643 LAA)

In 1961, there was another round of mergers, and 444th LAA Rgt absorbed R (Worcestershire) Bty of 442nd LAA Rgt, R Bty of 639th (Worcestershire Regiment) HAA Rgt, and 868 AA Reporting Bty at Bloxwich to form 444th (Staffordshire) LAA Rgt, which was redesignated 'Light Air Defence' in 1964.

When the TA was converted into the Territorial and Army Volunteer Reserve (TAVR) in 1967, the regiment was reduced to battery strength as 210 (Staffordshire) LAD Bty of 104 Light Air Defence Regiment, RA. In 2006, the battery was transferred to 106 (Yeomanry) Regiment, RA. Under the Army 2020 restructuring of the British Army, 210 (Staffordshire) Bty was transferred to 103 (Lancashire Artillery Volunteers) Regiment, RA, as a light gun battery.

== Honorary Colonel ==
Major the Hon Richard Glynne Lyttelton (4th son of Charles Lyttelton, 8th Viscount Cobham) was appointed Honorary Colonel of the regiment on 6 July 1937.
