= 100th Heavy Anti-Aircraft Regiment, Royal Artillery =

100th HAA Regiment, RA 500 HAA Regiment, RA
- Cap Badge of the Royal Artillery
- Active: 1 April 1939 – 12 May 1950
- Country: United Kingdom
- Branch: Territorial Army
- Role: Air defence
- Size: Regiment
- Part of: 42 AA Brigade; 2 AA Brigade; 12 AA Brigade; 68 AA Brigade
- Garrison/HQ: Motherwell; Hamilton
- Engagements: Clydebank Blitz; Operation Husky; Operation Avalanche; Italian Campaign

100th Heavy Anti-Aircraft Regiment, Royal Artillery, was a Scottish air defence unit of Britain's Territorial Army (TA) formed at Motherwell during the period of international tension leading up to the outbreak of World War II. It defended Glasgow during the early part of the war and then took part in the assault landings in Sicily (Operation Husky) and on mainland Italy (Operation Avalanche). The regiment continued in the postwar TA until amalgamated in 1950.

== Origin ==
The Territorial Army was rapidly expanded following the Munich Crisis, particularly the Anti-Aircraft (AA) branch of the Royal Artillery (RA). 100th Anti-Aircraft Regiment, RA was among the new units raised in the Spring of 1939: Regimental Headquarters (RHQ) and two AA Batteries (304 and 305) were formed at Motherwell, near Glasgow on 1 April. The new regiment formed part of 42 AA Brigade defending Glasgow and the Clyde estuary in AA Command's 3rd AA Division.

== World War II ==
=== Mobilisation and Phoney War ===
In June 1939, as the international situation worsened, a partial mobilisation of AA Command's TA units was begun in a process known as 'couverture', whereby each unit did a month's tour of duty in rotation to man selected AA gun and searchlight positions. On 24 August, ahead of the declaration of war, AA Command was fully mobilised at its war stations. There was little action for AA Command during the period of the Phoney War, which allowed it to continue building up its strength and equipment, for which 3rd AA Division was given a high priority.

Formation sign of 12 AA Division worn 1940–42.

On 1 June 1940, all RA units equipped with the older 3-inch or newer 3.7-inch and 4.5-inch guns were designated as Heavy AA (HAA) regiments to distinguish them from the new Light AA (LAA) regiments appearing in the order of battle. A new 321 HAA Bty formed on 1 June and was regimented with 100th HAA Rgt on 15 September. 347 HAA Battery formed in September and was regimented on 10 October, but on 22 October it transferred within 42 AA Bde to a new 111th HAA Rgt. In November the brigade transferred to a newly-formed 12th AA Division covering Western Scotland.

=== Clydebank Blitz ===
Although there were some night raids on Scottish cities, the main action in the Battle of Britain and the early part of The Blitz was over Southern England and there were few occasions when the Scottish AA defences were in action in 1940. However, on the nights of 13/14 and 14/15 March 1941 the shipyard town of Clydebank suffered the worst destruction and loss of life in any air raid on Scotland (the Clydebank Blitz). There were further heavy raids on Glasgow and Clydeside on 7/8 April and on 5/6 and 6/7 May. These five raids made Glasgow the fourth-heaviest hit British city in terms of bomb tonnage. There were no further raids on Scotland, and the Blitz is considered to have ended on 16 May when the Luftwaffe withdrew bombers for the campaign against the USSR.

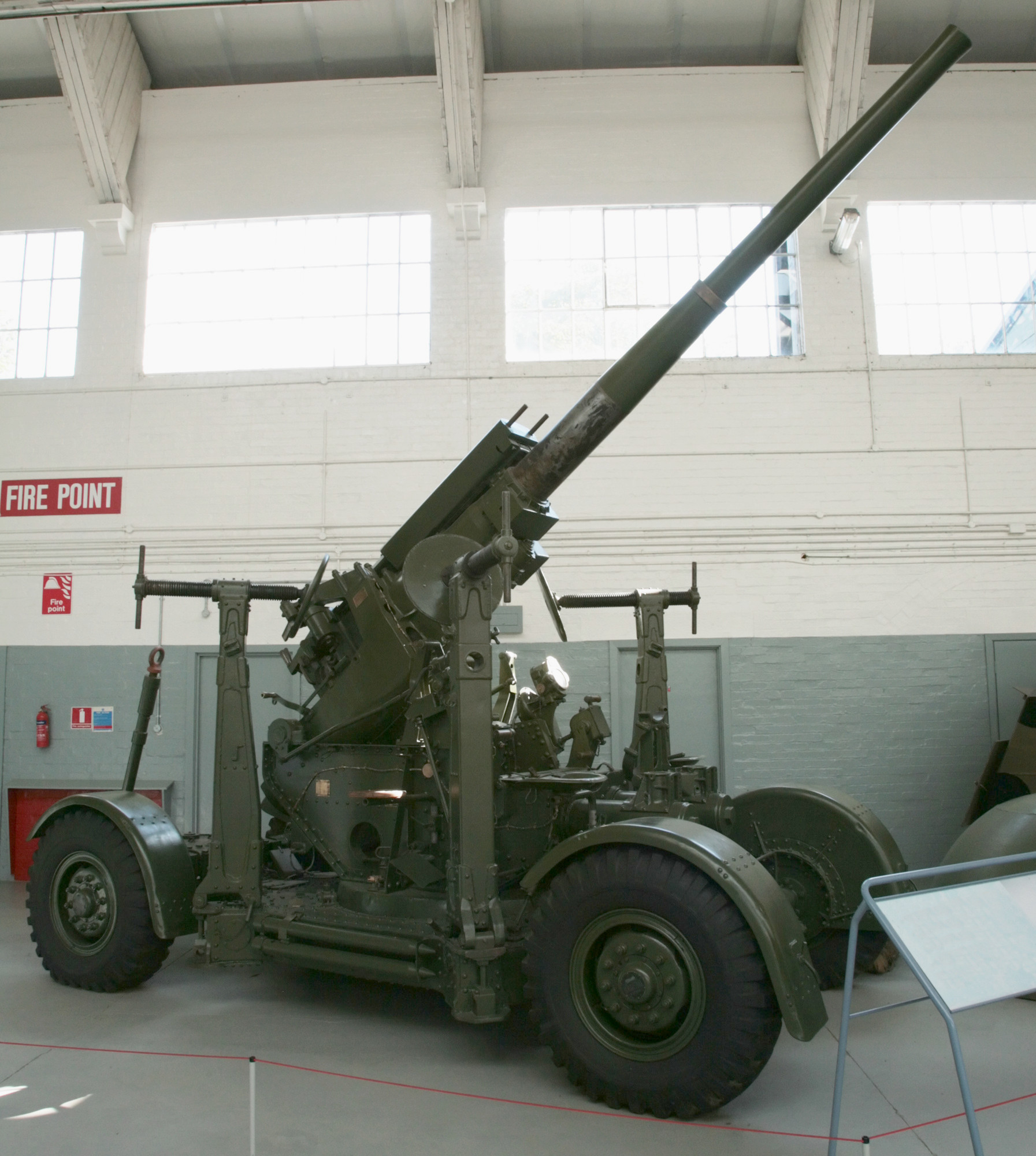
3.7-inch HAA gun preserved at Imperial War Museum Duxford.

At the beginning of 1941 the regiment sent a cadre of experienced officers and men to 205th HAA Training Regiment at Arborfield to provide the basis for a new 406 HAA Bty; this was formed on 16 January and joined the regiment on 10 April. 100th HAA Regiment also provided the cadre for 475 HAA Bty formed by 210th HAA Training Rgt at Oswestry on 4 September, but this battery was disbanded before it had completed training. Later a cadre from the regiment formed 485 (Mixed) HAA Bty at 210th Training Rgt on 16 October, which joined 141st (Mixed) HAA Rgt ('Mixed' indicating that women from the Auxiliary Territorial Service were integrated into the unit). 100th HAA Regiment continued in 42 AA Bde in 12th AA Division until May 1942, when it transferred to 57th AA Bde within the division, then in June it moved to 51 AA Bde in 3rd (later 12th) AA Division.

=== Middle East ===
As the flow of new AA units from the training centres continued, experienced units began to be prepared for overseas service. On 10 July 406 HAA Bty transferred to 119th HAA Rgt, leaving 100th HAA Rgt with the three-battery establishment for overseas service. By October the regiment was unbrigaded; it briefly joined 38 AA Bde in South East England in December and then left AA Command altogether.

At New Year 1943 the regiment was stationed at Williton in Somerset. On 14 January it moved to Gourock in Scotland where it embarked on HM Transport J10 in a convoy that sailed on 24 January. The convoy went via Freetown, Cape Town and Bombay, where the men were granted shore leave before re-embarking on HM Transport P428 on 22 March. They then proceeded via Basra and Aden to Port Tewfik in Egypt, where the regiment came under Middle East Forces. The regiment went into camps near Kassassin, where the batteries drew vehicles and carried out field artillery practice shoots.

On 15 May the regiment came under the command of 2 AA Bde, which was assigned to Eighth Army for the Allied invasions of Sicily (Operation Husky) and mainland Italy (Operation Avalanche). 100th HAA Regiment's batteries were allotted to composite Beach groups (or Beach Bricks as they were known in the Mediterranean Theatre) whose role was to secure, defend and control the landing beaches. Regimental HQ and 305 HAA Bty were assigned to No 35 Beach Brick, with 100th HAA Rgt's commanding officer (CO), Lt-Col G.V.N. Chadd, commanding all the AA elements of the brick; 304 HAA Battery was with No 34 Beach Brick; and 321 HAA Bty joined 231 Infantry Bde (for No 31 Beach Brick) on 6 June. While the rear parties and workshops remained at Kassassin, the brick elements of the regiment began intensive training with landing craft.

=== Operation Husky ===
Two of 100th HAA Rgt's batteries (304 and 321) were involved in the initial landings on Sicily on 10 July 1943. Some of the assault convoys were discovered and attacked en route, with 321 HAA Bty losing guns and vehicles in a ship that was sunk. Opposition on the beaches to the assault troops was light, and the beach bricks began landing. The advance parties of AA gunners were equipped as infantry, prepared for a firefight, but most were quickly able to move to the selected gunsites. The Landing Craft Infantry (LCI), with No 34 Beach Group, carrying the advance party of 304 HAA Battery smashed its ramp, came under fire, and veered off course, finally landing the party 4 miles (6.4 km) from its intended beach north of Avola. The party had to work along the coast, close to the enemy, through two minefields, before reaching their allotted area, where the guns were being landed from Landing Craft Tanks (LCTs). (Note: The AA commander for No 34 Brick, Lt-Col Wilkinson of 99th LAA Rgt, later described the landing to Lt-Col Chadd as 'A very pleasant exercise in Combined Operations with sufficient enemy fire to make it mildly interesting'.) 304 HAA Battery was soon moved from the beach to defend Pachino airfield after its capture. During the morning, the landing beaches and ships came under attack from the Luftwaffe, but the HAA batteries were restricted in targets they could engage: Allied fighters had priority above 6,000 feet (1,800 m). Early warning was also a problem, the HAA batteries discovering that their lightweight No 3 Mark III ('Baby Maggie') mobile gunlaying radar sets had proved too fragile for landing over an open beach. All they could do was establish barrages, which were wasteful of scarce ammunition. Also, radio and telephone communications could not be established, no overall AA HQ was landed, and coordination was poor: Allied airborne formations overflying the beachheads to their drop zones suffered badly from friendly fire. A great deal of reorganisation was required during the first two days of the operation.

As Eighth Army advanced up the east coast of the island during July, 73 AA Bde HQ landed at the port of Augusta on 19 July with the rear echelons of the batteries (Lt-Col Chadd arrived by air on 1 August to visit his batteries before returning to Tunis). Pachino and Augusta both came under concentrated air attack, including high level bombing, lower-level dive-bombing and ground Strafing by fighters. The HAA batteries now had their full complement of gun-laying radar and began to achieve success through aimed predicted fire and linear concentrated fire based on radar plots. By 7 August (D+28) 304 and 321 Btys had moved up to Catania under 73 AA Bde. By the end of the campaign in Sicily they were defending Milazzo, a jumping-off port for the invasion of mainland Italy.

=== Operation Avalanche ===
Having missed the 'Husky' landings, 305 HAA Bty formed part of No 35 Beach Group for the 'Avalanche' landings at Salerno. Lt-Col Chadd commanded all the AA elements of the beach group, including his own 305 HAA Bty, 328 LAA Bty of 99th LAA Rgt and 807 Mobile Smoke Company of the Pioneer Corps. 100th HAA Regiment's REME detachment provided the Light Aid Detachment (LAD) for the brick, and its signal section provided communications for the AA Operations Room (AAOR) to be established ashore. While the rear parties and workshops remained at Kassassin, the brick elements went to Kabrit on 28 June to begin intensive training on landing craft. On 12 July the brick elements began a 2,300 miles (3,700 km) road move to Tunis, which was reached on 30 July (the rear elements of the regiment went by sea to Tripoli).

After a rehearsal at Bizerta the 'Avalanche' convoy sailed from Tripoli on 7 August with RHQ aboard Landing Ship, Tank (LST) 314, and the equipment aboard LCTs while some of the personnel travelled on LCIs. The 'Avalanche' convoys were located by the Luftwaffe and attacked from the air during their approach to the beaches. When they began landing on 9 September there was no surprise, and with good observation the German shore defences opened heavy fire on the landing craft, causing casualties and delays in unloading. All the AA beach groups landed successfully, although the landings had not been easy. No 35 Beach Group landed on 'Sugar Beach', which was 2,500 yards (2,300 m) long, but with only two 200 yards (180 m) stretches (Red and Green) suitable for disembarkation from LSTs. The infantry landed at 03.30, the first AA reconnaissance parties at 05.30, but at dawn it was obvious that Green Beach was still being contested. Nonetheless, LST 314 beached at 07.30, the first Bofors LAA gun came ashore and went straight into action on the beach under shellfire; the first 3.7-inch HAA guns of D Troop came in around midday and were ready for action by 20.25. USAAF Lightning long-range fighters kept off the early air attacks, but small numbers of Focke-Wulf Fw 190 fighter-bombers made low-level attacks at noon and in the afternoon, one of which was destroyed by 328/99 LAA Bty. A night bombing raid at 22.30 was engaged with barrage fire by 305/100 HAA Bty. By 23.00, 35 Beach Group had 17 Bofors guns ashore, three of them deployed in anti-tank positions, and six 3.7s without radar. That night the rest of the 3.7s arrived and the area behind the beach was cleared for 3,000 yards (2,700 m).

For 10 days the beachhead battle raged within 3,000 yards (2,700 m) of the shore and it was impossible to implement the second stage of the planned AA deployment. Enemy fighter-bombers attacked in small numbers day and night, and those batteries already in position were heavily engaged in warding off multiple attacks delivered with little warning. The AAOR received inadequate reports from Royal Air Force and Royal Navy radar, and had to rely on the batteries' own GL radar plots. 12 AA Brigade's HQ radar instructor controlled AA concentrations covering the inland approaches, and a ring of concentrations over the bay was prepared against torpedo-dropping aircraft. Smokescreens laid by the pioneers eased the situation. Some of the HAA guns were pressed into action as medium artillery to assist the ground forces. After 10 days the Germans began to withdraw slowly to a position north of the Volturno river, and RHQ and 305 HAA Bty came under command of 12 AA Bde.

=== Italian campaign ===
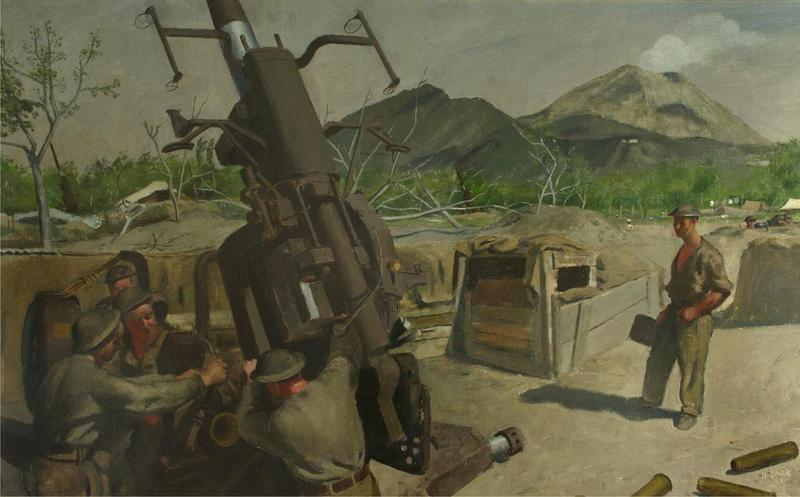
3.7-inch HAA gun deployed near Naples, with Mt Vesuvius in the background (painting by Henry Carr).

According to the RA regimental history, 'the regiments of 12th AA Brigade were, by now, raring to go on the long-planned move to Naples. Brigadier (Mortimer Wheeler), indeed, prepared a scheme to break out with a column of AA troops along the coast to Pompeii', but the bold plan was vetoed by Corps HQ. RHQ with 305 HAA and 328 LAA Btys and the AAOR remained at Salerno, where the rear party arrived by sea on 30 September. On 4 October they moved to Naples, and came under the command of 22 AA Bde while 12 AA Bde continued moving north. Naples was a difficult place to defend, because the rugged hinterland interfered with the GL radar and radio communications. One serious air raid was engaged on 5 November and the AA defences claimed some successes. 304 and 321 HAA Batteries arrived by road convoys between 7 and 9 November in time to engage an air raid on 9/10 November. On 10 December the regiment returned to the Salerno area, where it came under the shared command of 22 AA Bde and 66 AA Bde. Regimental HQ and 321 HAA Bty were at Salerno, 304 HAA Bty at Paestum and 305 HAA Bty at Montecorvino Airfield. In January 1944 the Salerno AA defences were strengthened to cover the build-up of shipping for the Allied landings at Anzio (Operation Shingle).

On 31 March 1944 the regiment moved from Salerno to the Foggia Airfield Complex under 62 AA Bde. 321 HAA Battery deployed at Spinazzola Airfield, later at Celone Airfield, 305 HAA Bty initially went to Barletta under operational command of 25 AA Bde, then to San Severo Airfield. 52 AA Bde arrived from North Africa on 20 April 1944 and took over defence of the Foggia complex. In June the batteries were switched around the Foggia airfields, with RHQ moving to Termoli.

By now, the Allied forces in Italy were suffering an acute manpower shortage, and AA gunners were being redeployed to other duties. Several HAA regiments were 'diluted' (as the process was officially described) by troops from the African Pioneer Corps (APC) who were replacing a proportion of the British personnel. 100th HAA Regiment was informed that it would be diluted by 1916 (Basuto) Company, APC, arriving at Naples about 10 June. By 26 June the whole regiment was non-operational so as to carry out this process. However, surplus AA units were being disbanded in increasing numbers and the decision to dilute was changed. Instead the whole regiment was ordered to disband, with all the officers and men reassigned, about one-third to be retrained as infantry.

100th HAA Regiment, with 304, 305 and 321 HAA Btys passed into suspended animation on 18 August 1944.

== Postwar ==
When the TA was reconstituted on 1 January 1947 the regiment was reformed at Hamilton, South Lanarkshire, as 500 (Mobile) Heavy Anti-Aircraft Regiment. It formed part of 68 AA Brigade (the former 42 AA Bde). (Note: The regiment's old number was taken by the war-formed 162nd HAA Rgt, which was reformed in the Regular Army as 100 HAA Rgt on 1 April 1947, though it was disbanded the following year.)

On 12 May 1950 the regiment was merged into 558 (Argyll and Sutherland Highlanders) (Mobile) HAA Rgt and RHQ of the merged regiment moved to Coatdyke.
