= 55th Brigade =

55th Brigade may refer to:

== Afghanistan ==
- 055 Brigade, a guerrilla organization loyal to Osama bin Laden

== China ==
- 55th Motorized Infantry Brigade (People's Republic of China)

== India ==
- 55th Indian Brigade of the British Indian Army in the First World War
- 55th Indian Infantry Brigade of the British Indian Army in the Second World War

== Iran ==
- 55th Airborne Brigade (Iran)

== Israel ==
- 55th Paratroopers Brigade

== Russia ==
- 55th Mountain Motor Rifle Brigade

== Ukraine ==
- 55th Artillery Brigade (Ukraine)

== United Kingdom ==
- 55th Infantry Brigade (United Kingdom)

=== Artillery units ===
- 55th Brigade, Royal Field Artillery of World War I
- 55th (Wessex) Brigade, Royal Field Artillery after World War I
- 55th (Kent) Anti-Aircraft Brigade, Royal Garrison Artillery
- 55th (Northumbrian) Medium Brigade, Royal Garrison Artillery

== United States ==
- 55th Maneuver Enhancement Brigade
- 55th Sustainment Brigade (United States)

== See also ==
- 55th Division (disambiguation)
- 55th Regiment (disambiguation)
