= Route 55 (disambiguation) =

Route 55 may refer to:

- Route 55 (MTA Maryland), a bus route in Baltimore, Maryland and its suburbs
- Route 55 (MBTA), a bus route in Boston
- London Buses route 55
- Melbourne tram route 55

== See also ==
- List of highways numbered 55
