= Type 55 =

Type 55 may refer to:

- Polaroid type 55, a type of film
- The Bugatti Type 55, a racing car
- Type 55 flour, the standard hard-wheat flour for baking pastries
- The Cadillac Type 55, an antique luxury car
- A Chinese variant of the 61-K
- A Chinese variant of the 120-PM-43 mortar
- Type 055 destroyer, a Chinese warship class
