= 55th Street =

55th Street may refer to:

== In New York City ==
- 55th Street (Manhattan)
- 55th Street station

== Elsewhere ==
- 55th/56th/57th Street station, a Metra and South Shore Line station in Chicago, Illinois
- East 55th station, Cleveland, Ohio
- Garfield Boulevard, also called "55th Street", Chicago, Illinois
