= Kitchener Barracks =

- Chatham
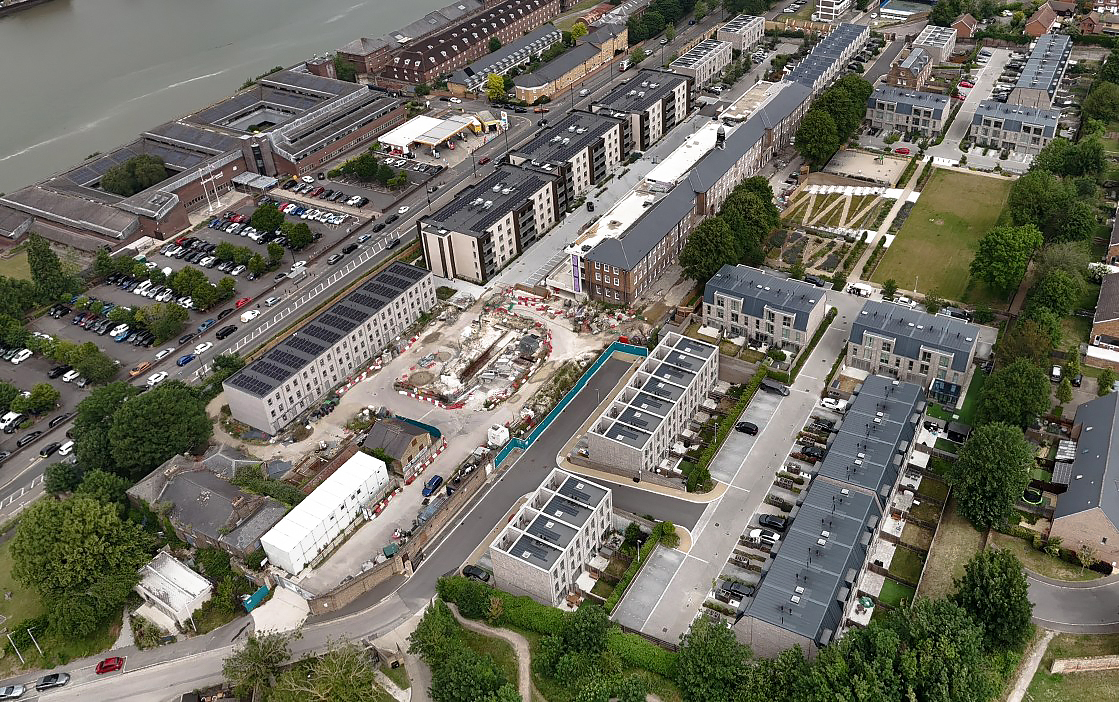
- Aerial view of the former Kitchener Barracks in Chatham, Kent, redeveloped into a residential housing estate.

Site information
- Type: Barracks
- Operator: British Army
- Open to the public: yes

Location
- Location within Kent
- Coordinates: 51.3889°N 0.5268°E

Site history
- Built: 1757
- Built for: War Office
- In use: 1757–2014

Kitchener Barracks was a British Army installation located in Chatham, Kent. The site has a long and varied history, spanning over two and a half centuries of military service before its closure in 2014. Originally known as Chatham Infantry Barracks, the site was renamed Kitchener Barracks in 1928 and continued to serve as a military base until its closure. It is now undergoing redevelopment for residential housing while preserving key historic structures.

== History ==
=== Early establishment (1757–1861) ===
Chatham Infantry Barracks was opened in 1757 as part of the military's effort to defend the Chatham Dockyard, which was crucial for naval operations. The barracks were one of the first large-scale, purpose-built Army barracks in England. Located east of the Dockyard on sloping ground, the barracks complex was enclosed by a perimeter wall and consisted of two main areas:

- The Lower Barracks, which housed the soldiers
- The Upper Barracks, later known as “The Terrace”, which housed the officers

The barracks featured a large central parade ground between the two sections. The officers’ quarters were situated on elevated ground to the east and accessed via a double ramp from the parade ground. They were arranged in a row, housing field officers, captains, and subalterns, each with different room allocations. Officers also had servants, who were accommodated in the upper garrets.

The soldiers’ accommodation was located to the west of the parade ground, arranged in three rows, with rooms shared by sixteen men in eight double beds.

Within 20 years of opening, the barracks took on additional functions, including serving as the Army Depot of Recruits and Invalids. It became a holding facility for new recruits, deserters, prisoners, and infirm soldiers returning from overseas. This led to the appointment in 1778 of an Inspector General for Recruitment, centralizing the oversight of enlistment. Chatham served as a training depot for new recruits until 1801, when the role was transferred to Parkhurst Barracks on the Isle of Wight.

=== 19th century: Expansion and upgrades ===
The Napoleonic Wars in the early 19th century saw a significant concentration of troops at Chatham Barracks. After the wars, the site became a home depot for various regiments and a key embarkation point for overseas deployments.

However, the condition of the barracks began to be criticized in the 1861 Royal Commission on Army Sanitation, which highlighted issues with overcrowding and poor facilities. In response, several upgrades were made:

- An additional storey was added to many of the barrack blocks to alleviate overcrowding
- New buildings were constructed, improving the kitchens, washrooms, and recreational spaces
- The officers' quarters were relocated to new buildings near Prince Henry's Bastion, and their former accommodation was reassigned to sergeants and married non-commissioned officers (NCOs).

In 1865, the old Garrison Hospital was closed and its buildings on Maxwell Road were converted into barracks, known as Upper Chatham Barracks (later Upper Kitchener Barracks).

=== Soldiers' Institute and Garrison Club (1861) ===
The Soldiers' Institute and Garrison Club, opened in 1861, was an important establishment for soldiers stationed at the nearby barracks. It provided recreational and social facilities such as a bar, library, and bowling alley. The building played a significant role in improving the welfare of soldiers and was run by a joint military and civilian committee. The Institute later became known as the Buckley Institute and eventually as the Men’s NAAFI. The building was demolished in the late 1960s or early 1970s, although a part of its structure was retained, contributing to the boundary wall of Kitchener Barracks.

=== 20th century: Renaming and further changes ===
In 1928, Chatham Barracks was renamed Kitchener Barracks when it was taken over by the Royal Engineers. Most of the original 18th-century buildings were demolished and replaced with more modern structures in the 1930s to 1950s. The barracks remained in active military use for much of the 20th century, serving various functions until its closure in 2014.

=== Closure and redevelopment ===
In 2014, the Ministry of Defence closed Kitchener Barracks, and the site was sold to J G Chatham Ltd (a subsidiary of modular developer TopHat). The redevelopment plans for the site included preserving some of the historic buildings, including the 1930s barrack block and the 18th-century surviving structure. The development was granted planning permission in 2015, with the aim of converting the site into 295 homes.

While the new residential development is taking place, several of the historic features of the barracks are being retained. The development continues to be known as Kitchener Barracks in recognition of its military history. The redevelopment is designed to integrate the historic architecture with modern living spaces, ensuring that the legacy of the barracks is preserved for future generations while providing much-needed housing for the Chatham area.

== Listed buildings ==
=== Six sections of boundary wall ===
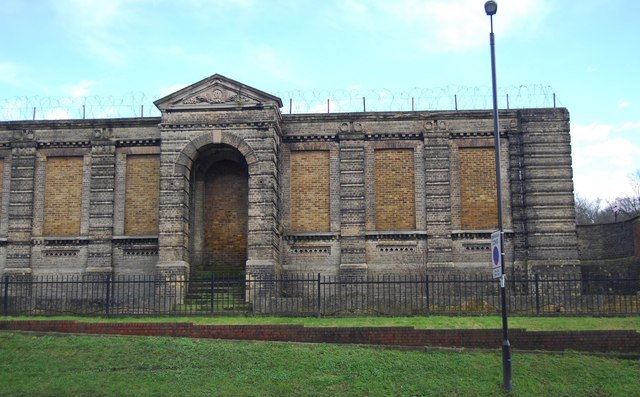

Six sections of boundary wall are a Grade II listed historic structure recorded in the National Heritage List for England (List Entry Number 1411051). The listing was first designated on 22 April 2013 in recognition of the walls’ architectural and historic significance as part of the former Chatham Infantry Barracks. The walls form surviving elements of the original boundary of the mid-18th century Chatham Infantry Barracks, later known as Kitchener Barracks. The barracks were established in 1757 to house a permanent garrison at a strategically important naval dockyard during the Seven Years’ War. Of the three purpose-built barracks constructed in this period nationally, vestiges survive most substantially at Chatham, making the site rare in the context of British military architecture. The designated sections comprise both original mid-18th-century fabric and later mid-19th-century additions. Some of the mid-19th-century work also forms elevations of buildings within the site, although those buildings themselves are not considered of special interest; it is the historic boundary that carries significance.

=== Former C18 barrack block ===
Former C18 barrack block is a Grade II listed building on the National Heritage List for England (List Entry Number 1410725). The structure was first added to the list on 22 April 2013 in recognition of its historic and architectural importance as one of the earliest surviving army barracks buildings in England. The barrack block was originally constructed in 1758 as part of the Chatham Infantry Barracks, later known as Kitchener Barracks, to provide permanent accommodation for soldiers stationed near the strategic naval base at Chatham Dockyard. Over time the building has undergone alterations in the 19th century and a major 21st-century extension; the latter is noted as not being of special architectural interest. In its later life, the structure was repurposed first as a canteen and subsequently as offices. The building occupies the north-west corner of the parade ground at the barracks complex, retaining significant mid-18th-century fabric that illustrates early military accommodation design and construction.

=== Former Ordnance Store ===
The Former Ordnance Store is a Grade II listed building recorded in the National Heritage List for England (List Entry Number 1410368). The building was first added to the list on 22 April 2013 in recognition of its architectural and historic interest as a military store dating from the early 19th century. The former ordnance store was constructed circa 1800 outside the southern boundary wall of the Chatham Infantry Barracks—later known as Kitchener Barracks—to provide storage space associated with the military functions of the site. During the early 19th century the building was extended to the east and west, and additional structures were added to the north; one of these later northern additions survives and interconnects with the original store.

== Company administration ==
Following the completion of the residential project, developer J G Chatham Limited entered administration on September 13, 2024. The Kitchener Barracks development transitioned to being managed and owned by the various housing providers and investors who had purchased sections of the site. The development did not halt, as the majority of the planned residential phases were either completed or already occupied by the time the company was dissolved in December 2025.

The current status of the development includes:

- Completion and Residency: Kitchener Barracks is now a residential community. Approximately 302 modular homes and apartments were delivered across three phases. By 2026, the site is fully operational with residents living in both the new modular blocks and the converted historic buildings.

Large portions of the site are now owned and managed by housing associations:

- Home Group owns and manages a block of 49 affordable homes and 13 townhouses.
- St Arthur Homes manages a collection of shared-ownership apartments that were delivered in the later stages.

J G Chatham Limited, the specific corporate vehicle used by parent company TopHat for this site, was formally dissolved on December 16, 2025, after its remaining financial assets were realized by administrators.
