= 55th Regiment of Foot (disambiguation) =

55th Regiment of Foot may refer to:

- 44th (East Essex) Regiment of Foot, 55th Regiment of Foot, numbered as the 55th Foot in 1747 and renumbered as the 44th in 1751
- 53rd (Shropshire) Regiment of Foot, 55th Regiment of Foot, raised in 1755 and renumbered as the 53rd in 1756
- 55th (Westmorland) Regiment of Foot, raised as the 57th and renumbered as the 55th in 1756
