= Class 55 =

Class 55 or 55 class may refer to:

- Belgian Railways Class 55, a class of Belgian diesel locomotive
- British Rail Class 55 (Deltic), a class of British diesel locomotive
- List of DRG locomotives and railbuses (Class 55), a class of German steam locomotive
- New South Wales 55 class locomotive, a class of Australian steam locomotive
