= 55th Motorized Infantry Brigade =

Brigade of the People's Liberation Army

55th Division (1949–53) 55th Infantry Division (1953–60) 55th Army Division (1960–85) 55th Motorized Infantry Division (1985–98) 55th Motorized Infantry Brigade (1998–2017) 55th Light Combined Arms Brigade (2017–)
- Active: 1949.5 - present
- Country: People's Republic of China
- Branch: People's Liberation Army Ground Force
- Type: Combined Arms
- Size: Brigade
- Part of: 77th Group Army
- Garrison/HQ: Lhasa, Tibet
- Engagements: Chinese Civil War, Sino-Indian War, Sino-Vietnamese War

The 55th Light Combined Arms Brigade, formerly the 55th Division, is a military formation of the People's Liberation Army Ground Force of the People's Republic of China. It is now one of six combined arms brigades of the PLA 77th Group Army.

The 55th Division (Chinese: 第55师) was created in May 1949 under the Regulation of the Redesignations of All Organizations and Units of the Army, issued by Central Military Commission on November 1, 1948, basing on the 12th Brigade of Shannan Military District. Its history could be traced to 24th Brigade, 8th Column of Jinjiluyu Field Army, formed on December 5, 1945. The first division commander was Fu Xianhui and the first political commissar was Zhang Ming (张明).

The division is part of 19th Corps. Under the flag of 55th division it took part in several major battles in the Chinese Civil War.

In July 1952 the division was put under direct control of the Northwestern Military Region following 19th Corps' disbandment.

In 1953 the division was reorganized and renamed as the 55th Infantry Division (Chinese: 步兵第55师). By then the division was composed of:

- 163rd Infantry Regiment;
- 164th Infantry Regiment;
- 165th Infantry Regiment (former 169th Regiment of the disbanding 57th Division);
- 306th Artillery Regiment (former 165th Regiment).

In April 1960 the division was renamed as the 55th Army Division (Chinese: 陆军第55师).

In October 1962 the division took part in the Sino-Indian War. During the war it inflicted 920 casualties to the Indian Army.

In October 1969 the division was transferred to the newly formed 19th Army Corps' control. 306th Artillery Regiment was renamed as Artillery Regiment, 55th Army Division.

In October 1985 the division was transferred to the 21st Army following 19th Army Corps' disbandment. At the same time the division was renamed as the 55th Motorized Infantry Division (Chinese: 摩托化步兵第55师).

In 1985 Reconnaissance Company, 55th Division took part in recon missions during the Sino-Vietnamese War. During the war it inflicted 120 casualties to PAVN forces, without anyone killed or injured.

From 1985 to 1989 the division maintained as a test-bed Light Motorized Infantry Division:

- 163rd Infantry Regiment was transferred to 63rd Infantry Division;
- 3rd Battalion, 163rd Infantry returned to the division, and 1st Battalion, 164th Infantry and 3rd Battalion, 165th Infantry was transferred to 163rd Infantry Regiment.
- HQ, 164th and 165th Infantry Regiment were disbanded;
- The division was then composed of 5 remaining infantry battalion, an artillery regiment and an antiaircraft battalion;
- Each infantry battalion was composed of 2 rifle companies (peacetime, during the war there might be 3), 1 antiaircraft machine-gun company, 1 105-mm recoilless rifle battery and 1 107-mm rocket artillery battery.

The test organization seemed not successful, and in August 1989 the division re-organized as a Northern Motorized Infantry Division, Catalogue B: all three infantry regiments reactivated. By the division was composed of:

- 163rd Motorized Infantry Regiment;
- 164th Motorized Infantry Regiment;
- 165th Motorized Infantry Regiment;
- Artillery Regiment.

In October 1998 the division was reduced brigade-sized and renamed as the 55th Motorized Infantry Brigade (Chinese: 摩托化步兵第55旅).

In 2003 the brigade was transferred to the 47th Army.

In 2017 the brigade was reorganized as the 55th Light Combined Arms Brigade (Chinese: 轻型合成第55旅) and transferred to the 77th Group Army following 47th's disbandment.
