= Athis, Marne =

Athis
- Commune
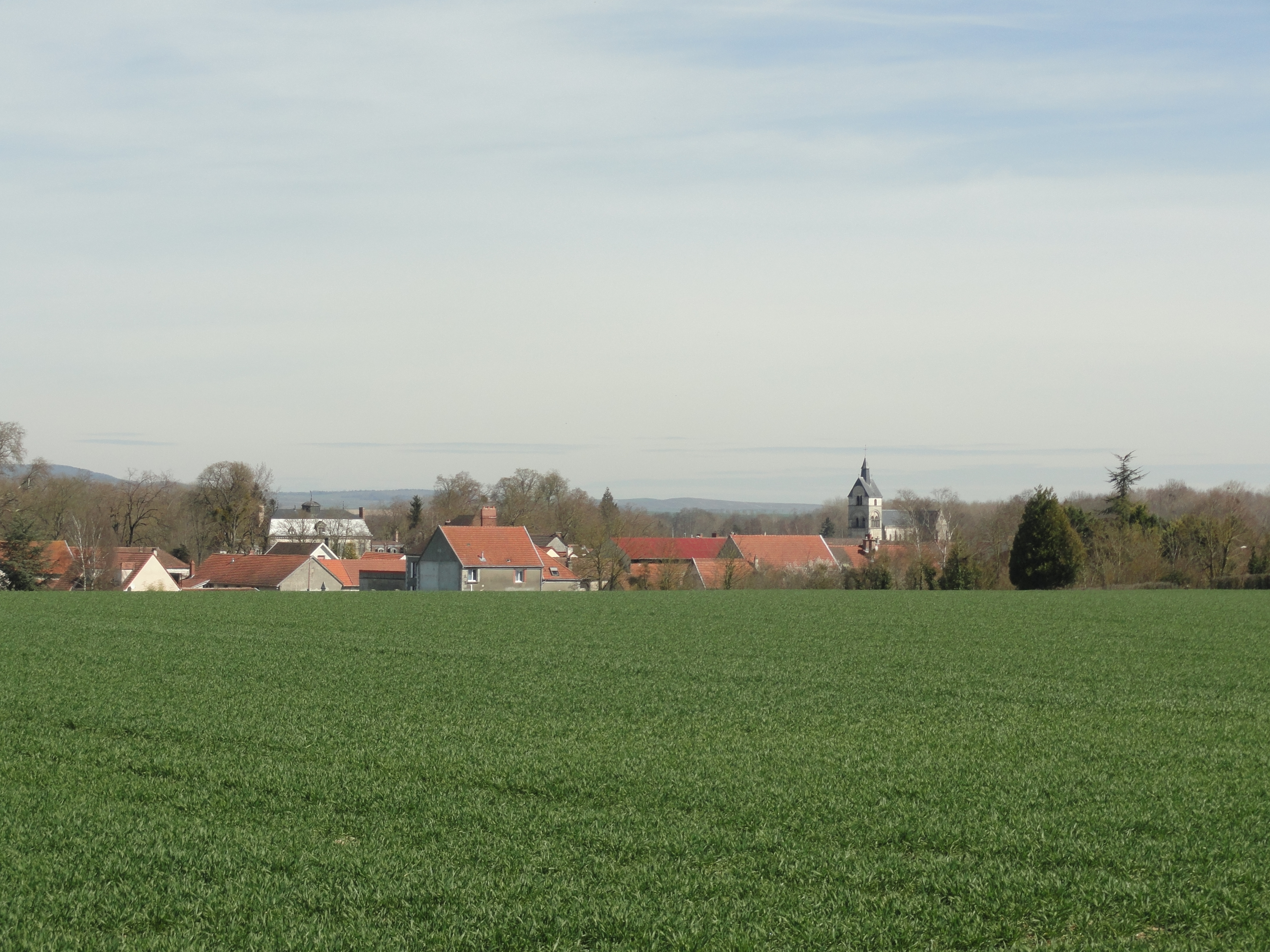
- A general view of Athis

- Coat of arms
- Location of Athis
- Location within France Location within Grand Est
- Coordinates: 49°01′01″N 4°07′44″E
- Country: France
- Region: Grand Est
- Department: Marne
- Arrondissement: Épernay
- Canton: Vertus-Plaine Champenoise
- Intercommunality: CA Épernay, Coteaux et Plaine de Champagne

Government
  - Mayor (2020–2026): Jean-Loup Évrard
- Area^{1}: 16.88 km^{2} (6.52 sq mi)
- Elevation: 76 m (249 ft)
- Population (2023): 885
  - Density: 52.4/km^{2} (136/sq mi)
- Time zone: UTC+01:00 (CET)
  - Summer (DST): UTC+02:00 (CEST)
- INSEE/Postal code: 51018 /51150
- ^{1} French Land Register data, which excludes lakes, ponds, glaciers > 1 km^{2} (0.386 sq mi or 247 acres) and river estuaries.

Athis (French pronunciation: [atis]) is a commune in the Marne department in northeastern France.

== Population ==
Historical population
Year	Pop.	±% p.a.
1968	547	—
1975	547	+0.00%
1982	588	+1.04%
1990	669	+1.63%
1999	758	+1.40%
2007	821	+1.00%
2012	837	+0.39%
2017	887	+1.17%
2023	885	−0.04%
Source: INSEE

== See also ==
- Communes of the Marne department
