= 55th (Kent) Heavy Anti-Aircraft Regiment, Royal Artillery =

55th (Kent) Heavy Anti-Aircraft Regiment
- Cap Badge of the Royal Artillery (pre-1953)
- Active: January 1925–July 1955
- Country: United Kingdom
- Branch: Territorial Army
- Role: Air Defence
- Size: Regiment
- Garrison/HQ: Tunbridge Wells
- Engagements: Battle of Britain; The Blitz; North Africa; Sicily; Italy

55th (Kent) Heavy Anti-Aircraft Regiment, Royal Artillery was a volunteer air defence unit of Britain's Territorial Army from 1925 until 1955. In World War II it defended the Thames Estuary, Medway Towns and Dover during The Blitz and later served in Iraq and North Africa. It then supported British Eighth Army and US Fifth Army during the Sicily and Italian campaigns until the end of the war.

== Origin ==
German air raids by Zeppelin airships and Gotha bombers on British cities during World War I had shown the need for strong anti-aircraft (AA) defences in any future war. When the Territorial Army (TA) was reformed in the 1920s it began raising five dedicated AA units of the Royal Artillery (RA). The last of these was 55th (Kent) Anti-Aircraft Brigade, raised in January 1925 at Tonbridge, Kent (later at Tunbridge Wells) with headquarters at Fort Clarence in Rochester. For a number of years, the regiment consisted of this single battery (which was redesignated 163 (Kent) Bty in April 1936) and in turn formed the only unit of 28th Air Defence Brigade. In 1935, it was joined by the independent 166th (City of Rochester) AA Battery, which had been converted from a coastal defence battery (of Kent Heavy Bde RA) in 1932. One further subunit was added to 55 AA Bde in 1936 when 205th (Chatham & Faversham) AA Battery was transferred from 58 (Kent) AA Brigade, which had been formed the previous year by conversion of an existing Medium Regiment RA.

As Britain's AA defences expanded during the 1930s, higher formations became necessary. 1st AA Division was formed to cover London and the Home Counties in 1935, and 55 AA Bde was assigned to 28th (Thames and Medway) AA Group based at Kitchener Barracks, Chatham.

On 1 January 1939, the RA replaced its traditional unit designation 'Brigade' by the modern 'Regiment', which allowed the 'AA Groups' to take the more usual formation title of 'Brigades'. On 1 April 1939, as part of the doubling of the strength of the TA after the Munich Crisis, 205 Battery left the regiment to provide the basis of a new 89th (Cinque Ports) AA Regiment, and two new batteries were formed, 307 at Tunbridge Wells, and 308 at Rochester. During 1939, a new 6th AA Division was formed to be responsible for the air defence of the Thames Estuary, Essex, and North Kent, and 28 AA Bde including 55th (Kent) AA Regt was transferred to this new formation before the outbreak of war.

== World War II ==
=== Mobilisation and Phoney War ===
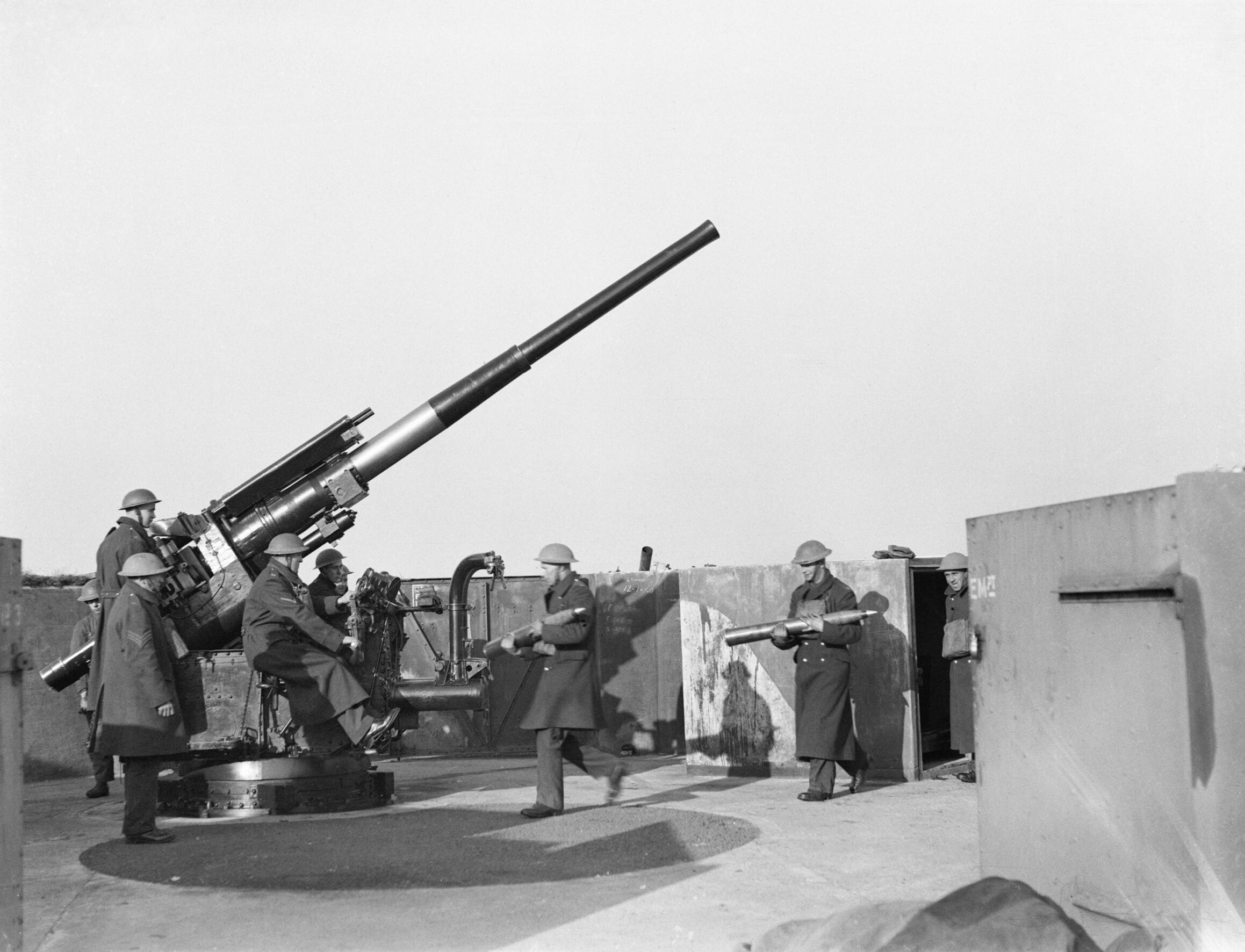
A 4.5-inch HAA gun at Chatham, 1939.

The TA's AA units were mobilised on 23 September 1938 during the Munich Crisis, with units manning their emergency positions within 24 hours, even though many did not yet have their full complement of men or equipment. The emergency lasted three weeks, and they were stood down on 13 October. In February 1939 the existing AA defences came under the control of a new Anti-Aircraft Command. In June, as the international situation worsened, a partial mobilisation of the TA was begun in a process known as 'couverture', whereby each AA unit did a month's tour of duty in rotation to man selected AA gun and searchlight positions. On 24 August, ahead of the declaration of war, AA Command was fully mobilised at its war stations.

Opportunities for action were rare during the Phoney War; however, on the night of 22/23 November 1939, the HAA guns of 28 AA Bde ('Thames South') combined with those on the other bank of the river ('Thames North') to engage at least two enemy mine-laying aircraft that had strayed into the mouth of the Estuary. By 11 July 1940, the Thames South AA layout operated by 28 AA Bde had a total of 70 HAA guns (3.7-inch and 4.5-inch).

On 1 June 1940, along with other AA units equipped with the older 3-inch and newer 3.7-inch AA guns, the 55th was designated a Heavy AA Regiment. 55 (Kent) HAA Regt operated as part of 28 AA Bde guarding the Thames, Chatham and Dover in 6 AA Division.

=== Battle of Britain ===
The Thames South guns were heavily engaged throughout the Battle of Britain. On 18 August, for example, German air raids appeared over RAF airfields at West Malling, Manston, Kenley, Biggin Hill, Gravesend and the town of Sevenoaks, all within four and a half hours in the afternoon. The guns of 28 AA Bde and its neighbours were in action and accounted for 23 enemy aircraft. Four days later a mass raid flew up the Thames Estuary to attack RAF Hornchurch on the Essex shore: the raid was broken up by the Thames guns, and then the fighters of No. 11 Group RAF attacked. Follow-up raids were marked for the fighters by 'pointer' rounds of HAA fire. On 1 September, over 200 aircraft attacked Maidstone, Biggin Hill, Kenley and Chatham: in joint action with the fighters, the guns broke up the formations and shot down four aircraft, but the airfields at Biggin Hill and Kenley were badly hit. Next day a mass raid arrived over the Medway and flew up the Thames towards Hornchurch. They came under heavy fire from the 3.7s and 4.5s of Thames South and Thames North and 15 were shot down before the fighters took over. On 7 September, heavy raids up the estuary attacked oil wharves at Thameshaven, Tilbury Docks and Woolwich Arsenal: a total of 25 aircraft were destroyed by AA guns and fighters. On 15 September, remembered as the zenith of the battle, the guns of 28 AA Bde were in prolonged combat, especially with aircraft over Chatham in the morning, and again in the afternoon.

=== The Blitz ===
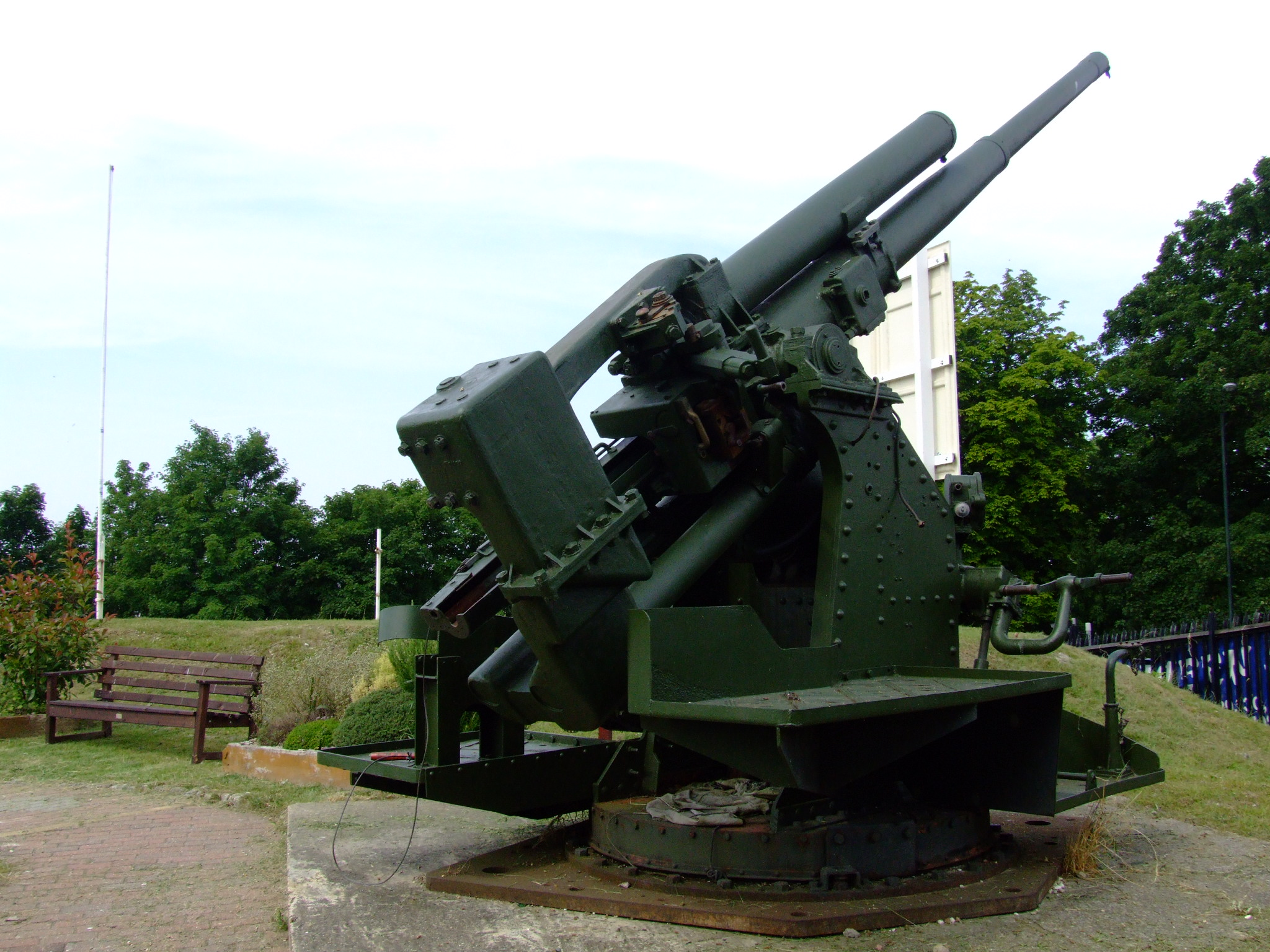
3.7-inch HAA gun preserved at Fort Amherst, Chatham

After 15 September, the intensity of Luftwaffe day raids declined rapidly, and it began a prolonged night bombing campaign over London and industrial towns (The Blitz). This meant that 28 Bde's guns were in action night after night as the bomber streams approached the London Inner Artillery Zone, but even with the assistance of searchlights, the effectiveness of HAA fire and fighters was greatly diminished in the darkness. By the start of the Blitz, Thames South had a planned layout of 25 HAA sites (of which only 16 were occupied). It ran from Dartford to Chatham, where there was a strongly defended area containing the naval dockyards at Chatham and Sheerness and the aircraft factory at Rochester. The Blitz ended in May 1941.

=== Mid-War ===
The regiment provided the cadre for a new 418 HAA Bty, which formed on 10 April 1941 at 205th HAA Training Rgt, Arborfield, and joined 55th HAA Rgt on 7 July. It also provided the cadre for 462 HAA Bty formed on 7 August 1941 at 205th HAA Training Rgt, which joined 133rd (Mixed) HAA Rgt on 10 September. ('Mixed' regiments were those where women of the Auxiliary Territorial Service (ATS) were integrated into the unit.) In June 1941, 308 Bty left the regiment on its way to West Africa Command to join 2nd HAA Rgt, West African Artillery.

In the autumn of 1941, the regiment left 28 AA Bde (leaving behind 418 Bty, which joined 59th (Essex Regiment) HAA Rgt) and briefly joined 34th (South Midland) AA Bde covering Birmingham and Coventry in 11th AA Division. However it soon left AA Command and became part of the War Office Reserve.

=== Middle East ===
The regiment left the UK in September 1942 and went by sea via Cape Town to Iraq, where in November it joined 'PAIFORCE' (GHQ Persia and Iraq).

55 HAA Regiment left Iraq in April 1943 to move to North Africa, where it came under command of Middle East Forces.

=== Sicily ===
In July 1943, the regiment was assigned to 15th Army Group for the Allied invasion of Sicily. For the initial landings on 10 July, 55 HAA Rgt's three batteries were allotted to beach groups of XXX Corps arriving during the first morning, but regiments were mixed up and no overall AA HQ was landed, so a great deal of reorganisation was required during the first two days of the operation. The lightweight No 3 Mark III ('Baby Maggie') mobile gunlaying radar sets proved too fragile for landing over an open beach. Also, radio and telephone communications could not be established, and Allied airborne formations overflying the beachheads to their drop zones suffered badly from friendly fire. As Eighth Army advanced up the east coast of the island during July, batteries of 55 HAA Rgt were stationed to defend the port of Augusta, where it reported daily attacks by Messerschmitt Bf 109s and nightly attacks by Junkers Ju 88s operating from 28,000 to 30,000 feet. At Augusta, 55 HAA Rgt came under the command of 73 AA Bde, while 307th Bty back at Syracuse was under 62 AA Bde.

=== Italy ===
During the invasion of mainland Italy in late 1943, beginning the Italian Campaign, 55 HAA Rgt at first remained in Sicily defending Augusta. Later, as the Allied armies advanced, the AA units followed to protect vital airfields and ports in the rear. 55th HAA Regiment crossed to Italy to join 52 AA Bde stationed at the airfield complex around Foggia. It later moved to 66 AA Bde supporting the advance of US Fifth Army particularly the Salerno bridgehead and airfields. After the breakout from Anzio in May 1944, 66 AA Bde took over that area, and then followed Fifth Army up the west coast through Rome until it reached Livorno, where 55 HAA Rgt defended the important supply port. During the winter of 1944–45, 55th HAA Rgt was transferred to 12 AA Bde, supporting British Eighth Army.

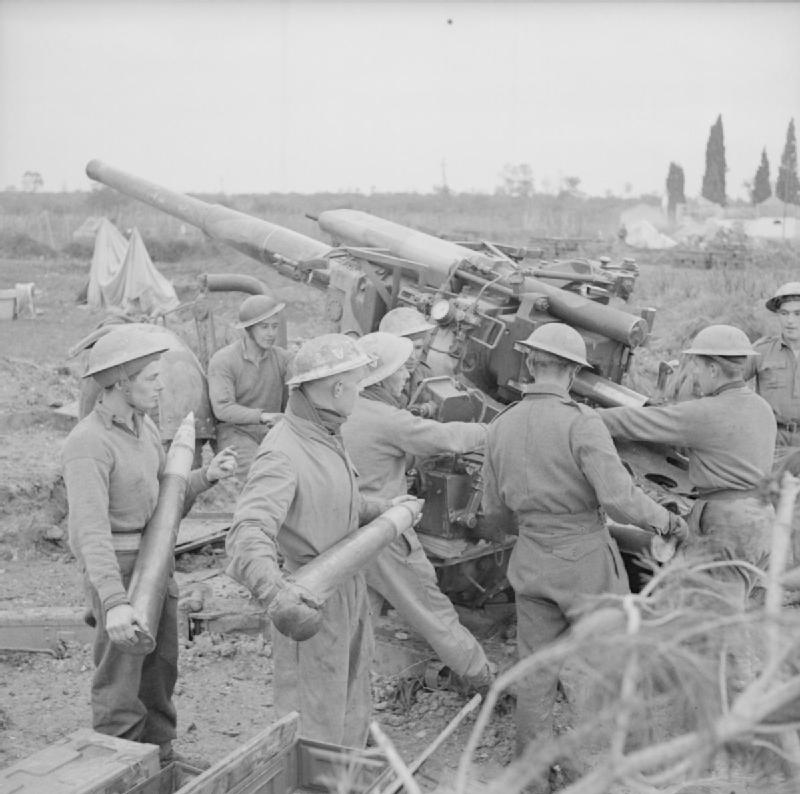
3.7-inch HAA gun in action in the field artillery role in Italy.

The Luftwaffe 's strength in Italy growing weaker, AA defence became less important and Eighth Army's HAA guns were increasingly used in the medium artillery role to support the ground troops. The effectiveness and accuracy of the 3.7-inch gun and the ample supply of AA ammunition made HAA units a useful addition for the artillery commanders. They were required to find and train their own men for unfamiliar work in Observation Posts (OPs) and Command Posts. Counter-bombardment, defensive fire and harassing fire programmes were carried out, and firing airbursts above entrenchments, and destroying hard targets such as buildings became specialities of the HAA gunners. 55 HAA Regiment spent months of the Italian campaign engaged in this way as corps medium artillery, often working with Air OP spotters. As a result, 55 HAA Rgt escaped the disbandment that befell many other AA units as the war drew to a close. By January 1945 it was with 12 AA Bde around Forlì. 12 Bde's remaining units were spread thinly to defend a large number of roads, ports and railheads for Eighth Army and landing grounds for the Desert Air Force. Luftwaffe intrusions were rare, but from April were increasingly made by jet aircraft which were difficult AA targets (the necessary advanced radar, predictors, fuse setters etc all being sent to AA units in North West Europe to deal with V-1 flying bombs). The regiment was still serving in Italy when the Surrender of Caserta was signed on 29 April 1945.

55th HAA Rgt with 163, 166 and 307 Btys was officially placed in suspended animation on 15 February 1946, but actually was retained as a cadre on 1 March.

== Postwar ==
=== 73 HAA Regiment ===
The war service personnel of 55 HAA Rgt continued under the old regimental and battery numbers until 1 April 1947, when they were redesignated 73 HAA Regiment in the Regular Army with the batteries reorganised as follows:

- 163 HAA Bty disbanded to resuscitate 86 Bty of 72/86 Field Bty, renumbered as 191 HAA Bty
- 166 HAA Bty disbanded to resuscitate 91 Bty of 49/91 Field Bty, renumbered as 196 HAA Bty
- 307 HAA Bty disbanded to resuscitate 92 Bty of 26/92 Field Bty, renumbered as 197 HAA Bty

This regiment and its batteries were reduced to cadre on 20 December 1954 and 191 Bty (and probably the others) was placed in suspended animation on 1 February 1955. All the batteries were officially disbanded on 1 January 1962. (Note: There was no connection between this regiment and the wartime 73rd HAA Rgt, a TA unit recruited in Staffordshire and reformed in 1947 as 473 (North Midland) HAA Rgt.)

=== 455 (Kent) HAA Regiment ===
The TA regiment was officially placed in suspended animation on 1 January 1947 and concurrently reformed at home as 455 (Kent) (Mixed) HAA Rgt (Mixed because it included members of the Women's Royal Army Corps). It was at first assigned to 54 (Thames & Medway) AA Bde (the former 28 AA Bde), but that formation was soon disbanded. On 1 August 1950, the regiment was briefly redesignated 455 (Kent) (Mixed) AA Fort Regiment (Thames Estuary), consisting of 'P' Battery and 'Q', 'R' and 'S' AA Forts, but it reverted to its previous title on 24 November the same year.

After AA Command disbanded on 1 March 1955, 455 HAA Rgt also began to disband, and this was completed by 1 July 1955.

== Honorary Colonels ==
The following officers served as Honorary Colonels of the regiment:

- Col Sir Osmond E. d'Avigdor-Goldsmid, Bt – appointed 3 February 1932
- Col J. Egginton, OBE, TD – appointed 26 October 1935
- Lt-Col W.E.H. Cooke, OBE, TD – appointed 19 January 1939
