= 55th Regiment =

55th Regiment may refer to:

- 55th (Kent) Heavy Anti-Aircraft Regiment, Royal Artillery
- 55th (Westmorland) Regiment of Foot
- 55th Air Defense Artillery Regiment

== See also ==
- 55th Division (disambiguation)
