= 55th Division =

In military terms, 55th Division or 55th Infantry Division may refer to:

== Infantry divisions ==
- 55th Infantry Division (Bangladesh)
- 55th Division (People's Republic of China)
- 55th Infantry Division (France)
- 55th Infantry Division "Savona", Kingdom of Italy
- 55th Division (Imperial Japanese Army)
- 55th Infantry Division (Poland)
- 55th Infantry Division (Russian Empire)
- 55th Infantry Division (South Korea)
- 55th Guards Naval Infantry Division, Russia/Soviet Union
- 55th Guards Rifle Division, Soviet Union
- 55th Rifle Division, Soviet Union
- 55th (West Lancashire) Division, United Kingdom, 1908–1920
- 55th (West Lancashire) Infantry Division, United Kingdom, 1921–1945
- 55th Infantry Division (United States)

== Other divisions ==
- 55th Mixed Aviation Division, Soviet Union

== See also ==
- List of military divisions by number
- 55th Brigade (disambiguation)
- 55th Regiment (disambiguation)
