= 89th =

89th is the ordinal form of the number 89. 89th or Eighty-ninth may also refer to:

- A fraction, 1/89, equal to one of 89 equal parts

== Geography ==
- 89th meridian east, a line of longitude
- 89th meridian west, a line of longitude
- 89th parallel north, a circle of latitude
- 89th parallel south, a circle of latitude
- 89th Street

== Military ==
- 89th Brigade (disambiguation)
- 89th Division (disambiguation)
- 89th Regiment (disambiguation)
- 89th Squadron (disambiguation)

== Other ==
- 89th century
- 89th century BC

== See also ==
- 89 (disambiguation)
