= 89th (Cinque Ports) Heavy Anti-Aircraft Regiment, Royal Artillery =

89th (Cinque Ports) HAA Regiment, RA 489th (Cinque Ports) HAA Regiment, RA
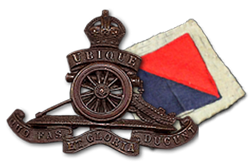
- Royal Artillery cap badge and AA patch
- Active: 1 April 1939–10 March 1955
- Country: United Kingdom
- Branch: Territorial Army
- Role: Anti-Aircraft artillery
- Size: Artillery regiment
- Garrison/HQ: Sittingbourne; Ramsgate
- Engagements: Battle of Britain; Battle of Crete; Siege of Tobruk; North Africa; Italy

Commanders
- Notable commanders: Lt-Col J.M. Stebbings, MC, EM, TD

The 89th (Cinque Ports) Heavy Anti-Aircraft Regiment, Royal Artillery was an air defence unit of Britain's Territorial Army (TA) raised in Kent just before the outbreak of World War II. It served during the Battle of Britain and defended the Suez Canal while batteries served in the Battle of Crete and the Siege of Tobruk. The regiment then fought through the North African and Italian campaigns.

== Origin ==
This unit was formed as a consequence of the doubling in size of the TA after the Munich Crisis in late 1938. Formally, it was a duplicate of the newly converted 75th (Home Counties) (Cinque Ports) Anti-Aircraft Regiment, based on two batteries (234th and 235th) transferred from that regiment, together with a more experienced anti-aircraft (AA) battery (205th), which had served with several Kent units, most recently 55th (Kent) AA Rgt, and provided the regimental headquarters (RHQ) at Sittingbourne. Whether officially sanctioned or not, the new regiment used the same 'Cinque Ports' subtitle as its parent regiment raised in the ancient Cinque Ports of Kent. (Note: The Monthly Army List and Litchfield do not acknowledge the subtitle, but it is used in the regiment's War Diary, especially in 1942. It was officially awarded to the successor regiment in 1953.) The new regiment came into existence on 1 April 1939 with the following organisation:

89th (Cinque Ports) Anti-Aircraft Regiment, Royal Artillery

- RHQ at Crown Quay, Sittingbourne
- 205 (Kent) AA Battery at Sittingbourne
- 234 (Kent) AA Battery at Deal
- 235 (Kent) AA Battery at Margate

The regiment formed part of 28th (Thames and Medway) AA Brigade at Chatham in 6th AA Division.

== World War II ==
=== Mobilisation ===
In June 1939, a partial mobilisation of the TA was begun in a process known as 'couverture', whereby each AA unit did a month's tour of duty in rotation to man selected AA positions. On 24 August, ahead of the declaration of war, Anti-Aircraft Command was fully mobilised at its war stations. All batteries of 89th AA Regiment were reported as ready for action on 27 August, and the newly formed 306 AA Battery joined from 75th HAA Rgt on 30 August. War was declared against Germany on 3 September.

306 AA Bty left for training in September, and 235 (Kent) Bty deployed to The Midlands as an independent battery in October, but both rejoined in February 1940. 306 AA Battery was then passed back to 75th HAA Rgt at the end of May. During the spring of 1940, batches of recruits were posted to the regiment from 210th AA Training Regiment at Oswestry. From 1 June 1940 those AA units like 89th armed with 3.7-inch guns were termed 'Heavy AA' (HAA) to distinguish them for the Light AA (LAA) units then being formed.

The commanding officer (CO) was Lieutenant-Colonel John Morley Stebbings, TD, who as a young officer had won the Edward Medal by leading a rescue party into the ruins of the Uplees explosives factory near Faversham after the Great Explosion on 2 April 1916. He had subsequently won a Military Cross (MC) on the Western Front. Between the wars Stebbings had served with the 75th (Home Counties) (Cinque Ports) HAA Rgt and was its CO before the 89th HAA Rgt was separated from it.

=== Battle of Britain ===
205 and 235 Batteries carried out the regiment's first engagement early on the morning of 10 May, when their fire broke up a formation of Junkers Ju 88s flying over Kent. There were more engagements as the Battle of Britain got under way, with 205 Bty being sent with its guns to reinforce the AA defences of Southampton in June and Dover in July. Dover was attacked almost daily during August, and there were some raids over Maidstone and Chatham.

=== Egypt ===
On 15 September 1940, 89th HAA Rgt was relieved of operational duties and ordered to prepare to move overseas. At the end of November it moved into Butlin's Holiday Camp at Clacton-on-Sea to complete its mobilisation. The regiment then entrained for Glasgow where it embarked on HM Transport J5 (SS City of Canterbury) and sailed on 15 December 1940 (Note: Not 1939 as given by Farndale and British Military History; the correct chronology is provided by the War Diaries.) bound for Egypt. It sailed with a strength of 49 officers and 1419 men including the attached Signal Section (Royal Corps of Signals), Workshop (Royal Army Ordnance Corps (RAOC)) and Transport (Royal Army Service Corps), which all came from 60th (City of London) HAA Rgt. After a close call on Christmas Day when the German surface raider Admiral Hipper intercepted its convoy, the regiment disembarked at Port Tewfik, Suez, on 16 February 1941. After a spell in a training camp, the regiment assumed responsibility for the air defence of Suez on 28 April, with Lt-Col Stebbings as AA Defence Commander (AADC).

Towards the end of January, the Luftwaffe had begun attacking the Suez Canal from Italian bases on Rhodes, dropping magnetic and acoustic mines that disrupted shipping in the canal. Most of the vital supplies and reinforcements for Middle East Command therefore had to be landed at Suez rather than passing through the canal. While RHQ of 89th HAA Rgt developed the AA defences of the port facilities at Suez, its own three batteries were dispersed. 205 Battery was transferred to British Troops Egypt in early April, ready to join 6th Division, which was being reformed (though it appears the battery never actually joined it before the division went to Syria). Later in the month 234 Bty was sent to Crete to bolster the defences after the British forces were evacuated from Greece, and 235 Bty went to reinforce the AA defences of Tobruk.

=== Battle of Crete ===
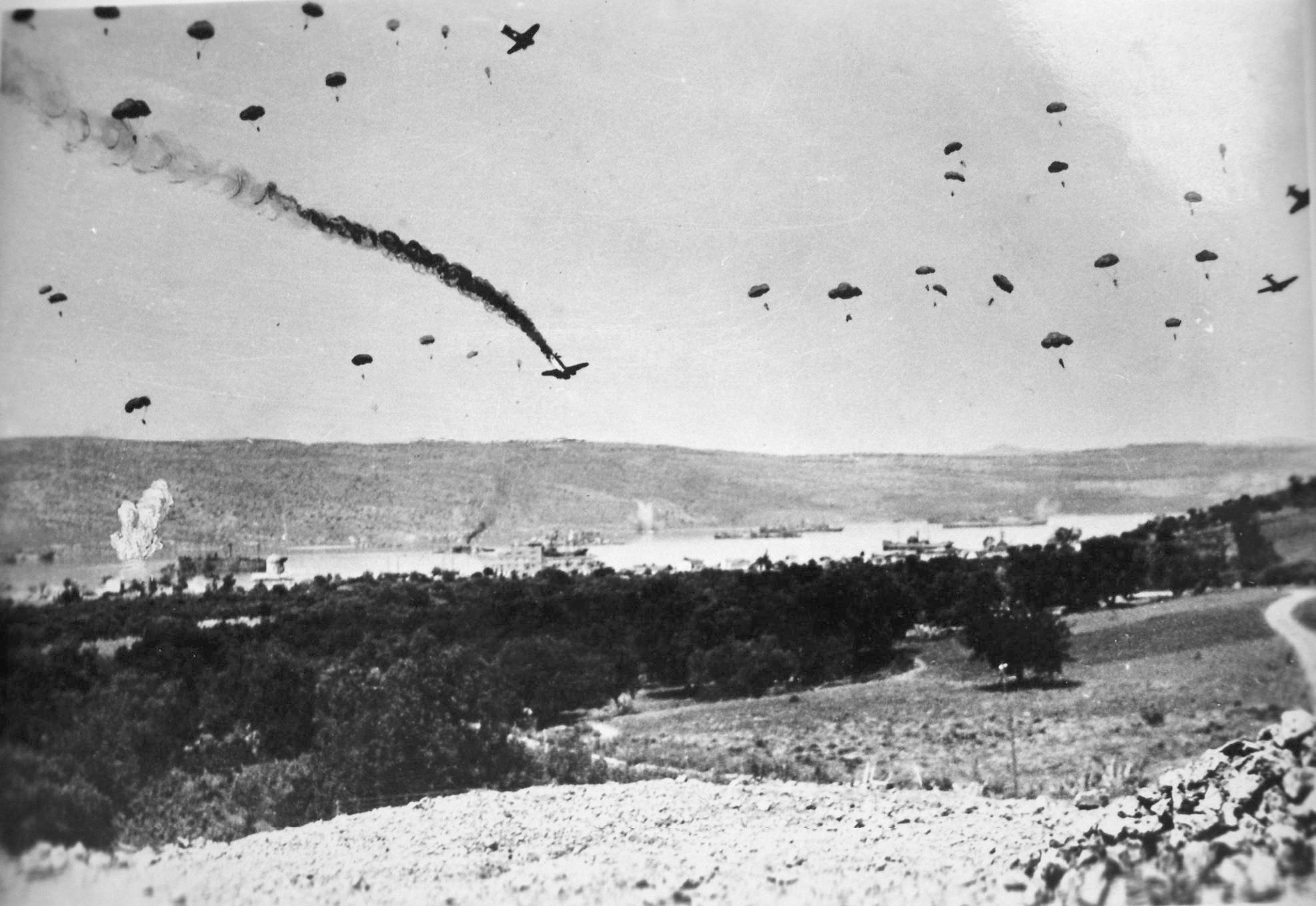
German paratroops and Junkers Ju 52 transport aircraft (one burning) over Crete, May 1941.

234 (Kent) Battery disembarked at Suda Bay in Crete on 24 April and was deployed in the Suda-Canea area to protect harbour installations alongside 151 (London) Bty from 51st (London) HAA Rgt, both under the command of RHQ 52nd (East Lancashire) LAA Rgt.

The British bases on Crete had been regularly dive-bombed in March and April, and the HAA guns at Suda had been reorganised for close defence against these tactics. The battery was in action immediately after unloading its guns on 25 April. On 14 May Left Troop of 234 Bty was moved to Suda Point, and the concentration of AA fire reduced shipping losses. In May the Luftwaffe began attacking the AA sites directly, and the gunners replied with multiple Vickers .50 machine guns and Lewis guns as well as scoring direct hits with their 3.7-inch guns. When the German airborne assault began at 06.00 on 20 May, the HAA guns took a heavy toll of the German transport aircraft and gliders coming in. Some of the paratroopers were specifically tasked with knocking out the AA defences but those briefed to take Left Troop found the positions empty and were wiped out. But Right Troop of 234 Bty at Canea was swamped by glider troops against whom their eight rifles and two Lewis guns were ineffective. The survivors were forced to surrender after close-quarters fighting with grenades and sub-machine guns. A party of Royal Marines recaptured the gun positions later that day and rescued 32 survivors, but the Germans had damaged the guns; other guns around Suda had burst barrels from excessive firing.

Although German casualties in men and aircraft had been heavy, their troop transports were able to use Maleme airfield the next day, followed by landings from the sea. On 26 May, the Allied forces were ordered to retreat, the remaining AA positions were ordered to destroy their equipment and move by small boats or cross-country for evacuation from the south coast of the island. Many could not be evacuated and became prisoners of war. The Royal Artillery historian describes 234 as a 'very gallant battery' who had 'defended their guns to the last and took a terrible toll of their attackers in those terrible few minutes'.

Of 12 officers and 347 other ranks who landed in Crete, 234 (Kent) Battery's total casualties in the campaign were 57 killed in action and 187 missing, believed prisoners of war, many of them wounded (only 30 wounded members of the battery managed to get back to Egypt). One of those killed was Lt Hedley Stebbings, in whose memory a medical charity was later founded by his sister. GHQ Middle East ordered the depleted battery's disbandment, which was carried out on 1 July. The survivors were posted to 16 Bty of 2nd HAA Rgt.

Lieutenant A.P. Corbett was awarded an MC and Serjeant E.A. Hooker a Military Medal (MM) for their service in Crete with 234 Bty. On one occasion Hooker had put his foot on a grenade thrown into his gun pit, 'risking the full force of the explosion, in order to save his detachment'.

=== Siege of Tobruk ===
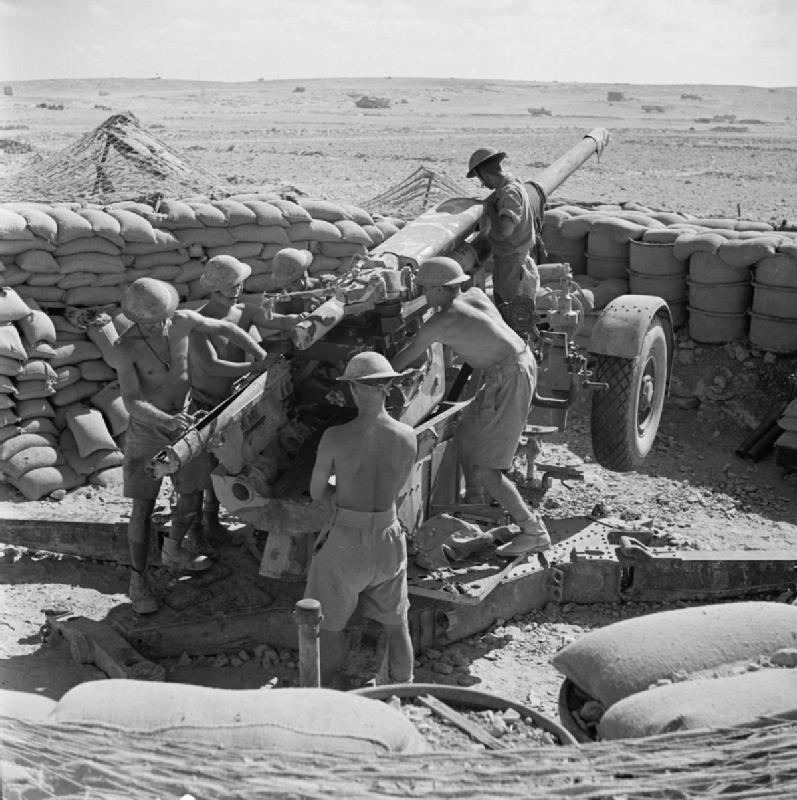
Gunners cleaning a 3.7-inch anti-aircraft gun near Tobruk, 19 August 1941.

Meanwhile, 235 (Kent) Bty under Major G.D. Boyd had also been detached from the regiment at Suez to replace 151 Bty in 51 HAA Rgt, which was operating with the Western Desert Force (WDF). General Erwin Rommel counter-attacked in Cyrenaica in April 1941, forcing the WDF back, and by 7 April 51 HAA Rgt was within the Tobruk perimeter. 235 Battery, together with eight static 3.7-inch guns brought by sea, arrived to reinforce the garrison just before the ring closed round the port on 11 July, beginning the Siege of Tobruk. In Tobruk, 51st HAA Rgt, including 235 Bty, came under the command of 4th AA Bde, which was a major element of the garrison.

Including the static guns delivered by sea, there were a total of 24 3.7-inch HAA guns available to the garrison (although two were disabled early in the siege by premature bursts), and 152 and 235 Batteries each had an Italian 102mm gun that had been restored to working order by 51st HAA Rgt's workshop detachment. 152, 153 and 235 HAA Batteries, together with 51st HAA Rgt's workshops and signals, formed part of the Harbour Defended Area under the command of RHQ 13th LAA Regiment. Early in the siege, RHQ and 152 Bty of 51 HAA Rgt were attacked by Stukas and suffered serious casualties, after which they were evacuated by sea. 235 (Kent) and 153 (London) Btys however remained there throughout the 240-day siege under 4th AA Bde.

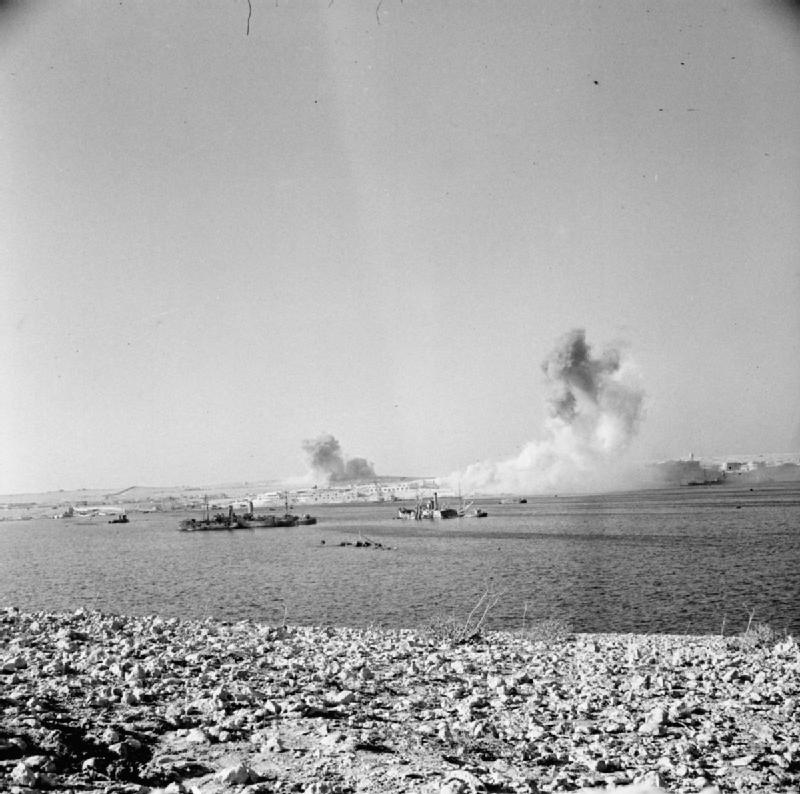
German bombs explode during one of the heaviest air raids on Tobruk. The photograph was taken from a trench adjoining an AA gun.

The Official History records that the AA artillery in Tobruk was 'incessantly in action against attacks of all kinds, from all heights, but especially by dive-bombers'. The Royal Artillery historian notes that these Stuka attacks concentrated on gun positions, which was a serious threat to HAA sites, whose instruments could not cope with the rapid height changes. The gunners devised a tactic of opening fire with short Fuzes just before the dive started, to force the pilots to fly through a ring of bursts. The battery cooks, drivers and clerks then joined in, firing machine-guns and captured 20mm Breda guns. This aggressive method was known as 'Porcupine', and was so effective that the Luftwaffe changed to high-level bombing. Each mobile HAA troop established at least one alternative site and the guns were regularly switched between them, the empty sites being rigged up as dummies. The two available gun-laying (GL) radar sets had to be positioned away from the vulnerable gun sites and used for early warning to supplement the single RAF radar, and a ring of searchlights operated round the harbour at night. Harbour defence was by pre-arranged barrages by five of the six HAA troops, the sixth troop remaining on watch for other raiders. 4th AA Brigade recorded that there was a steady decline in numbers of aircraft attacking as the siege went on, with the attackers switching to high-level and night attacks. In the last two months of the siege, troops of HAA guns took it in turn to move out to the perimeter and take on ground targets under the control of 9th Australian Division. Their long-range harassing fire made up for the shortage of medium artillery. After Tobruk was relieved in November 1941, 51 HAA Rgt and 235 HAA Bty were withdrawn to Palestine for rest and reorganisation.

235 Bty's casualties by the end of August were 5 killed and 13 wounded, and a further 5 were killed in September and October. Lieutenant M.F. Felton was awarded the MC, Serjeant W. Pay and Lance-Bombardier E.L. Billinghurst the MM for their service with 235 Bty at Tobruk. Billinghurst, a gun layer, had refused medical assistance when wounded on 25 May and continued at his post, informing the gun No 1 of the line of attack of the enemy aircraft.

=== Defence of Suez ===
While the Crete and Tobruk operations were going on, RHQ and 205 Bty (8 × 3.7-inch guns and 1 × Gun-Laying Mk I* radar set) had remained at Suez under 2nd AA Bde. RHQ 89th HAA Rgt provided the HQ for AADC Suez, which meant that a number of different AA units came under its command at various times. At the beginning these included a Gun Operations Room (GOR) established in May, a Troop of Bofors guns from 6 LAA Bty (left behind when 2nd LAA Rgt went to Tobruk), and 306 Searchlight Bty from 27th (London Electrical Engineers) Searchlight Rgt, replaced by 390 S/L Bty from the same regiment when 306 Bty went to Tobruk. 100 LAA Battery (52nd LAA Rgt) and 276 HAA Bty (88th HAA Rgt) (8 × 3.7-inch guns, 1 × GL Mk I set) arrived in July, and the LAA guns were deployed round Port Tewfik and Shallufa Airfield.

Occasional bombing raids by Ju 88s flying from Greece against Suez began in July and became almost nightly in August and September. The targets were the Port Tewfik dock installations, the oil refinery, railway marshalling yards, Shallufa Airfield and shipping at the anchorage in the bay

During September and October, the AA defences were strengthened so that, by the end of October, 89th HAA RHQ/AADC Suez had the following units under command:

- 88th HAA Rgt (RHQ, 281 and 282 Btys) (16 × 3.7-inch, 1 × GL Mk I)
- 205/89 HAA Bty (8 × 3.7-inch, 1 × GL Mk I)
- 5 HAA Bty, Royal Australian Artillery (RAA), (8 × 3.7-inch) – from Beirut, replacing 276 HAA Bty
- 100/52 LAA Bty (12 × Bofors)
- 9 LAA Bty, RAA (12 × Bofors)
- 81/25 LAA Bty (12 × Bofors)
- One Troop each of 1 and 38/13 and 41/115 LAA Btys (12 × Bofors)
- 390/27 S/L Bty (less one Troop) (24 × S/Ls)
- 135 'Z' Bty (64 × Z Battery rocket projectors)
- 89 HAA Rgt Signals
- Gun Operations Room

281 HAA and 41 LAA Btys left the area in November and were replaced by 5 HAA Bty, Royal Malta Artillery and 37/13 LAA Bty, and 16/2 HAA and 150/42 LAA Btys replaced the two Australian batteries in January.

There were five further Luftwaffe attacks on Suez during November.

Lt-Col Stebbings was promoted to Acting Brigadier in November 1941 and took command of 1st AA Bde (he was later captured at the Fall of Tobruk in June 1942). Lt-Col W.R. Brackett took over as CO of 89th HAA Rgt and AADC Suez. 231 HAA Bty, from 74th (City of Glasgow) HAA Rgt, officially replaced 234 (Kent) Bty in 89th HAA Rgt on 1 December. Regimental morale was boosted in February when Prime Minister Winston Churchill, as Lord Warden of the Cinque Ports, accepted the appointment of Honorary Colonel of the regiment.

By the end of February 1942, 89th HAA RHQ/AADC Suez had six 4-gun HAA sites manned by 205, 231 and 282 HAA Btys, 20 Bofors gun sites of 150 and 231 LAA Btys, four 3-inch 'Z' Battery sites of 135 Bty, and 15 S/L sites of 304 and 390 S/L Btys. The following month 26 HAA Bty (9th HAA Rgt) replaced 282/88 HAA Bty, and 5 HAA Bty, RMA, installed two new 4.5-inch guns. Also in March, 2nd AA Bde HQ moved to Cairo so that Suez AADC came under Canal AADC until 1st AA Bde HQ arrived to take over in May, and there was considerable shuffling of LAA and S/L sites.

235 (Kent) HAA Bty returned to the regiment from Palestine in April 1942, and relieved 26/9 HAA Bty in May; the regiment therefore had three batteries once more (205, 231 and 235) and was directly responsible for 9th AA Operations Room (AAOR), F Coast Bty and A Royal Marines HAA Bty. By the end of the summer it was concentrated on the western side of the Suez Canal entrance, while 61st (Middlesex) HAA Rgt arrived to take charge of all HAA batteries on the eastern side of the canal, and 41st LAA Rgt to take over all LAA and Z batteries under AADC Suez.

During the summer, as Rommel's forces neared the Egyptian frontier, Luftwaffe reconnaissance flights and raids over Suez and the canal increased once more, but there was no concentrated bombing campaign against the vital bases. By October, Eighth Army was preparing its counter-strike at El Alamein. In October, 89th HAA Rgt was transferred to 21st AA Bde from 1st AA Bde, which was being prepared for mobile operations under Eight Army. Shortly afterwards a new 106 AA Defence HQ arrived to take over the role of AADC Suez, and 89th HAA Rgt moved into camp for mobile training and anti-tank training before the end of the year.

=== Defence of Benghazi ===
By now, Eighth Army had broken through the Axis positions at the Second Battle of El Alamein and began its pursuit across Libya, AA units were leap-frogged forwards to cover the important objectives as they were taken. 1st AA Brigade and 51st (London) HAA Rgt moved up from Egypt to defend the captured port of Benghazi and the nearby airfields for the supporting fighters and bombers of the Desert Air Force. 89th HAA Regiment followed up on 21 January 1943 from an AA practice camp at Suez to relieve 51st (London) HAA Rgt in these positions on 29 January and remained there until the end of the North African Campaign in May 1943.

Lt-Col Brackett was appointed AADC Benghazi on 17 February

There was an air raid on 18 February, when one attacker was shot down, but generally there was little enemy activity, the German and Italian air forces concentrating their efforts on the fighting fronts. 89th HAA Regiment was kept busy convoying supplies and carrying out a trial of the effectiveness of the 3.7-inch gun against concrete emplacements (a technique that later bore fruit in Italy).

When US heavy bomber squadrons arrived at Benina airfield in February, 205 HAA Bty provided 4 guns and a GL set to provide cover.

By mid-March 1943, 89th HAA RHQ/AADC Benghazi had the following units under command:

- RHQ 89th HAA Rgt
  - 205/89 HAA Bty
  - 231/89 HAA Bty
  - 235/89 HAA Bty
  - 89th HAA Rgt Signal Section
  - 89th HAA Rgt Workshop (the Royal Electrical and Mechanical Engineers (REME) had taken this role over from the RAOC)
  - 28/9 HAA Bty (later replaced by 280 Bty from 87th HAA Rgt, then by 312 Bty from 54th (City of London) HAA Rgt)
  - 17 AAOR
- RHQ 2nd LAA Rgt (later replaced by 13th LAA Rgt and 86th LAA Rgt, then by 61st LAA Rgt)
  - Two Troops 6/2 LAA Bty
  - 37/2 LAA Bty
  - 155/2 LAA Bty
  - 2nd LAA Rgt Signal Section
  - 2nd LAA Rgt Workshop
- C Troop 135 Z Bty
- 390/27 S/L Bty
- 7th Radio Repair Section

After the end of the Tunisian Campaign in May 1943, the AA defences of North Africa could be scaled back, and 135 Z Battery returned to Suez in June. However, the build-up of the USAAF's IX Bomber Command at landing grounds around Benghazi still required protection, and guns were redeployed accordingly.

On 15 August, 89th HAA Rgt was relieved at Benghazi and moved by stages back to Egypt, where Lt-Col C.S. Partridge took command. The batteries practised AA and ground shooting. Then on 18 September the regiment embarked at Alexandria for Italy.

=== Defence of Brindisi ===
The regiment disembarked at Taranto on 24 September 1943, two weeks after it had been captured in Operation Slapstick, and proceeded by rail to Brindisi Docks where the guns and transport arrived by sea. The guns were quickly deployed, 231 and 235 Btys round the docks with a GOR, 205 Bty detached at Grottaglie Airfield, and were ready for action by 30 September. Lt-Col Partridge became AADC Brindisi, under 8th AA Bde.

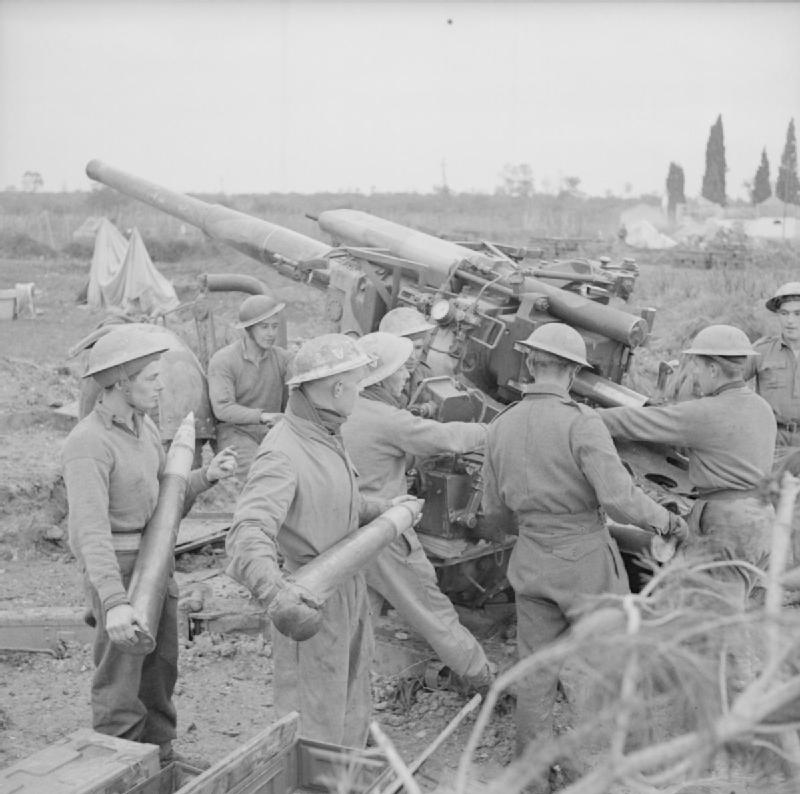
A 3.7-inch gun in action in Italy

By 22 October 1943, 89th HAA RHQ/AADC Brindisi had the following units under command in the Bridisi Gun Defence Area (GDA):

- RHQ 89th HAA Rgt
  - 231/89 HAA Bty
  - 235/89 HAA Bty
  - 89th HAA Rgt Signal Section
  - 89th HAA Rgt Workshop
  - 7th Radio Repair Section
  - GOR
- 234/75 LAA Bty
- B and D Troops 568 Independent S/L Bty
- 101 Coast Bty (at Monticelli)

There were occasional engagements of reconnaissance overflights by Luftwaffe aircraft, but Brindisi was not bombed, unlike nearby Bari. HAA and LAA guns sited within sight of the sea were given a secondary coast defence role, and dual purpose coast defence guns were given a secondary AA role under the AADC.

By March 1944, the deployment had become as follows:

- RHQ 89th HAA Rgt
  - 205/89 HAA Bty
  - 231/89 HAA Bty
  - 235/89 HAA Bty
  - 89th HAA Rgt Signal Section
  - 89th HAA Rgt Workshop
  - 7th Radio Repair Section
- 243/78 HAA Bty
- 21 AAOR (later 51 AAOR from 25th AA Bde)
- 61/31 LAA Bty
- 92/34 LAA Bty (from 25th AA Bde)
- 568 (Ind) S/L Bty (four Troops plus workshop)
- 101 Coast Bty

In July 1944, 25th AA Bde relieved 8th AA Bde and took responsibility for Brindisi, bringing with it 278 and 279 Btys of 87th HAA Rgt and 233 and 246 LAA Btys of 75th LAA Rgt. However, by now the air threat to the southern Italian cities had diminished and Allied Forces in Italy had an excess of AA units. Meanwhile, the ground forces were suffering a manpower shortage, so a number of AA regiments were disbanded and their personnel redistributed. 89th Heavy Anti-Aircraft Regiment was one of those chosen for disbandment, and the regiment was formally placed in suspended animation from 31 August 1944.

== Postwar ==
When the TA was reconstituted on 1 January 1947, the regiment was reformed at Ramsgate as 489 (Mobile) HAA Rgt. It came under the command of 53rd AA Brigade (the former 27th (Home Counties) AA Bde) based at Dover, part of 1 AA Group. In 1953, the regiment was officially given the subsidiary title 'Cinque Ports' after its parent 75th (Home Counties) (Cinque Ports) HAA Rgt raised in the ancient Cinque Ports of Kent.

Anti-Aircraft Command was disbanded on 1 March 1955 and 489 (Cinque Ports) HAA Rgt was disbanded at the same time.

== Honorary Colonel ==
Winston Churchill, Lord Warden of the Cinque Ports, was appointed Honorary Colonel of 89th (Cinque Ports) HAA Rgt on 20 February 1942.
