= 89 =

89 may refer to:

- 89 (number), the natural number following 88 and preceding 90
- Atomic number 89: actinium
- 89ers, a German Eurodance duo
- 89 Julia, a main-belt asteroid

== Years ==
- 89 BC
- AD 89
- 1989
- 2089

== See also ==
- 89th (disambiguation)
- List of highways numbered 89
