= 89 Squadron =

89 Squadron or 89th Squadron may refer to:

- No. 89 Squadron RAF, a unit of the United Kingdom Royal Air Force
- 89th Flying Training Squadron, a unit of the United States Air Force
- 89th Airlift Squadron, a unit of the United States Air Force
- 89th Tactical Missile Squadron, a unit of the United States Air Force

== See also ==
- 89th Division (disambiguation)
