= 74th Heavy Anti-Aircraft Regiment =

74th Anti-Aircraft Regiment may refer to:

- 74th (City of Glasgow) Heavy Anti-Aircraft Regiment, Royal Artillery, a British Territorial Army unit formed in Scotland in 1938
- 74th Heavy Anti-Aircraft Regiment, Royal Artillery, a Regular British Army unit formed in 1947
