= 89th Brigade =

89th Brigade may refer to:

== British India ==
- 89th Indian Infantry Brigade

== Israel ==
- Oz Brigade, also known as 89th Brigade

== Spain ==
- 89th Mixed Brigade

== United Kingdom ==
- 89th Brigade (United Kingdom)
- 89th Brigade, Royal Field Artillery, British Army unit in World War I
- 89th (3rd West Lancashire) Brigade, Royal Field Artillery, British Army unit after World War I

== United States ==
- 89th Military Police Brigade
- 89th Sustainment Brigade

== See also ==
- 89th Division (disambiguation)
- 89th Regiment (disambiguation)
