= John Muirhead (solicitor) =

Sir John Muirhead
- Born: 19 April 1889
- Died: 17 February 1972 (aged 82)
- Military career
- Allegiance: United Kingdom
- Branch: Territorial Army
- Service years: 1912–1946
- Rank: Brigadier
- Commands: VI Corps Signals (1915–1917); 51st (Highland) Division Signals (1917–1918); 52nd (Lowland) Division Signals (1921–1929); Glasgow University Officers Training Corps, (1929–1932); 74th (City of Glasgow) Heavy Anti-Aircraft Regiment, Royal Artillery (1938–1941); 2nd Anti-Aircraft Brigade (1941); 4th Anti-Aircraft Brigade (1941–1942); 1st Anti-Aircraft Brigade (1942)
- Conflicts: Western Front (World War I); Siege of Tobruk
- Awards: Knight Bachelor; Distinguished Service Order; Military Cross; Mentioned in Despatches (5); Territorial Decoration
- Other work: Lecturer in Roman Law, Glasgow University; President, Law Society of Scotland; Dean, Royal Faculty of Procurators in Glasgow; Chairman, George Outram & Co

Brigadier Sir John Spencer Muirhead, DSO, MC, TD, DL (19 April 1889 – 17 February 1972) was a Scottish solicitor, academic, and Territorial Army officer in both World Wars. He was President of the Law Society of Scotland in 1950, and was Dean of the Royal Faculty of Procurators in Glasgow in 1952.

== Early life ==
Muirhead was born on 19 April 1889. His father James Muirhead and a grandfather were both lawyers. He was educated at St Ninian's School, Moffat, and Fettes College, then an all-boys private school in Edinburgh. He studied Literae Humaniores at Oriel College, Oxford, and graduated with a double first Bachelor of Arts (BA) degree in 1912. He then entered the University of Glasgow to study law. His studies were interrupted by the First World War, but he returned after demobilisation and graduated with a Bachelor of Laws (LLB) degree.

== Military career ==
While studying at Glasgow, Muirhead was commissioned as a 2nd lieutenant in the part-time Territorial Force on 25 February 1913. Before the First World War, he served with the Royal Engineers Signal Service in the Scottish Cable Signal Company based in Glasgow. In 1915, he joined the British Expeditionary Force in France as officer commanding (OC) VI Corps Signals and from 1917 was OC 51st (Highland) Division Signals. By the end of the war he was an acting Major, had been awarded the Distinguished Service Order and the Military Cross, and had been Mentioned in dispatches three times. After the war, on 6 August 1919, he reverted to the temporary rank of captain.

When the Territorial Force was reformed as the Territorial Army (TA) in 1921, Muirhead was confirmed in the rank of Major in the new Royal Corps of Signals and commanded 52nd (Lowland) Division Signals until 1929, being promoted to Lieutenant-Colonel in 1925 and Brevet Colonel in 1929. He was Deputy Chief Signal Officer of Scottish Command from 1929 to 1932, and from 1931 to 1933 he was also OC of Glasgow University Officers Training Corps, which comprised a field artillery battery.

When the TA was rapidly expanded at the time of the Munich Crisis in 1938, Muirhead raised and commanded the new 74th (City of Glasgow) Heavy Anti-Aircraft Regiment, Royal Artillery. The TA was mobilised shortly before the outbreak of the Second World War, when 74th HAA Regiment formed part of 42nd Anti-Aircraft Brigade defending Glasgow. However, in the winter of 1940–41, while British cities were being attacked in The Blitz, 74th HAA Regiment was sent to reinforce the defences of Egypt. Here it came under the command of 2nd AA Brigade in the Nile Delta in January.

The regiment's role was to defend the Suez Canal and Port Suez against air raids by Axis bombers. On 23 August 1941 Muirhead was promoted to acting Brigadier to take command of 2 AA Brigade, but on 3 September he was sent by sea to command 4 AA Bde besieged in Tobruk. This formation of heavy and light AA guns and searchlights was an important part of the Tobruk garrison ('The Rats of Tobruk'), who had been besieged since April. Although the bulk of the garrison had been relieved, most of the AA gunners had served in the town from the beginning. The Official History records that the AA artillery in Tobruk was 'incessantly in action against attacks of all kinds, from all heights, but especially by dive-bombers', and that Muirhead and his predecessor were 'responsible for the spirited and successful anti-aircraft defence throughout the siege'. Under Muirhead's command in the last two months of the siege, troops of HAA guns took it in turn to move out to the perimeter and take on ground targets with long-range harassing fire to make up for the shortage of medium artillery. Tobruk was relieved in November 1941 during Operation Crusader.

Afterwards, Muirhead was sent to take command of 1st AA Brigade, which had just arrived to take over responsibility for AA defence in Palestine. Its particular role was to protect the ports and oil facilities at Haifa and Tripoli, Lebanon. Muirhead was twice mentioned in dispatches for his work with Middle East Forces. In 1942 Muirhead was sent to Washington, DC in a staff role. Upon demobilisation in 1946 he was awarded the honorary rank of Brigadier, and served as chairman of the Glasgow Territorial Association from 1950.

== Professional career ==
Muirhead completed his legal studies after World War I and began to practise as a solicitor, becoming lecturer in Roman Law at Glasgow University from 1920 to 1954. He was secretary of the Glasgow University Court from 1937 to 1945. He was President of the Law Society of Scotland in 1950, and Dean of the Royal Faculty of Procurators in Glasgow in 1952. He was a member of the Royal Commission on University Education in Dundee in 1951, of the Royal Commission on Scottish Affairs in 1952, and was chairman of the St Andrews University Statutory Commissioners in 1953. He was also chairman and later honorary president of George Outram & Co, publishers of the Glasgow Herald.

== Honours and decorations ==
On 3 June 1918, in the King's Birthday Honours, he was awarded the Distinguished Service Order (DSO). During World War I, he also received the Military Cross (MC) and was mentioned in despatches three times. On 13 October 1920, he was awarded the Territorial Decoration (TD) for long service in the Territorial Army. In the 1953 Coronation Honours List, he was appointed a Knight Bachelor in recognition of his time as President of the Law Society of Scotland, and therefore granted the title sir.

On 10 August 1936, he was appointed a Deputy Lieutenant (DL) by the Lord Lieutenant of Stirlingshire. In August 1960, he was appointed Vice-Lieutenant of Stirlingshire. He resigned the appointment on 23 March 1964.

He was also a member of the Royal Company of Archers (the Royal Bodyguard for Scotland).

== Family life ==
In 1917 Muirhead married Geraldine, daughter of Maxwell Hedderwick of Glasgow and they had three sons (one of whom predeceased him) and one daughter. One of their sons, Roger Muirhead, died on 11 April 2025, at age 103, and was a WW2 veteran of El Alamein, the invasion of Sicily, the Normandy landings and Burma.

== Notes ==
=== References ===
- Gen Sir Martin Farndale, History of the Royal Regiment of Artillery: The Years of Defeat: Europe and North Africa, 1939–1941, Woolwich: Royal Artillery Institution, 1988/London: Brasseys, 1996, ISBN 1-85753-080-2.
- Maj-Gen I.S.O. Playfair, History of the Second World War, United Kingdom Military Series: The Mediterranean and Middle East, Vol II: The Germans come to the aid of their Ally (1941), London: HMSO, 1956/Uckfield, Naval & Military Press, 2004, ISBN 1-845740-66-1.
- Brig N.W. Routledge, History of the Royal Regiment of Artillery: Anti-Aircraft Artillery 1914–55, London: Royal Artillery Institution/Brassey's, 1994, ISBN 1-85753-099-3
