= 89th Regiment =

89th Regiment of 89th Infantry Regiment may refer to:

- 89th Cavalry Regiment, a unit of the United States Army
- 89th Regiment of Foot (disambiguation), several units of the British Army
- 89th (Cinque Ports) Heavy Anti-Aircraft Regiment, Royal Artillery
- 89th Punjabis, a unit of the British Indian Army

American Civil War regiments:

- 89th Illinois Infantry Regiment, a unit of the Union Army
- 89th Indiana Infantry Regiment, a unit of the Union Army

== See also ==
- 89th Division (disambiguation)
