= Yorkhill Parade drill hall =

Military installation in Glasgow, Scotland

- Glasgow, Scotland

Site information
- Type: Drill hall

Location
- Location within Glasgow
- Coordinates: 55.86516°N 4.29486°W

Site history
- Built: Early 20th century
- Built for: War Office
- In use: Early 20th century – Present

The Yorkhill Parade drill hall was a military installation in Glasgow.

== History ==
The building was designed as the headquarters of the Glasgow Yeomanry and was completed in the early 20th century. The regiment was mobilised at the drill hall in August 1914 before being deployed to Gallipoli. The facility was expanded to including a riding school in the 1920s. The regiment converted to become the 101st (Glasgow Yeomanry) Brigade, Royal Field Artillery in 1922 and evolved to become the 54th (Queen's Own Royal Glasgow Yeomanry) Anti-Tank Regiment, Royal Artillery in 1938 before converting back to become the Queen's Own Royal Glasgow Yeomanry again in 1947.

74th (City of Glasgow) Heavy Anti-Aircraft Regiment, Royal Artillery reformed at Yorkhill Parade after World War II as 474 (City of Glasgow) Heavy Anti-Aircraft Regiment. It amalgamated with other Glasgow AA units in 1955.

In 1956 the Queen's Own Glasgow Yeomanry amalgamated with the Lanarkshire Yeomanry and the 1st/2nd Lothians and Border Horse to form the Queen's Own Lowland Yeomanry. The regiment was reduced to a cadre sponsored by 154 Transport Regiment, Royal Corps of Transport in 1969. The drill hall was used as a base by 154 Transport Regiment for fire service duties during fireman's strike of 1973. It was subsequently largely demolished but some of stabling was converted for industrial use after the regiment was disbanded in 1975.
