= 89th Division =

In military terms, 89th Division or 89th Infantry Division may refer to:

- 89th Division (People's Republic of China)
- 89th Infantry Division (German Empire)
- 89th Infantry Division (Wehrmacht), Germany
- 89th Division (Imperial Japanese Army)
- 89th Guards Rifle Division, Soviet Union
- 89th Motor Rifle Division, Soviet Union
- 89th Rifle Division, Soviet Union
- 89th Infantry Division (United States)

== See also ==
- List of military divisions by number
- 89th Brigade (disambiguation)
- 89th Regiment (disambiguation)
- 89th Squadron (disambiguation)
