= 89th Regiment of Foot (disambiguation) =

Three regiments of the British Army have been numbered the 89th Regiment of Foot:

- 89th (Highland) Regiment of Foot, (Morris's Highlanders), raised in 1759
- 89th Regiment of Foot (1779), raised in 1779
- 89th (Princess Victoria's) Regiment of Foot, raised in 1793
