= 89th Infantry Division (German Empire) =

89th Infantry Division (89. Infanterie-Division)
- Active: 1914-1919
- Country: German Empire
- Branch: Imperial German Army
- Type: Infantry
- Size: Approx. 12,500
- Engagements: World War I: Battle of Łódź (1914); Romanian campaign

The 89th Infantry Division (89. Infanterie-Division) was a formation of the Imperial German Army in World War I. The division was formed in November 1914 as the provisional Westernhagen Division (Division Westernhagen), named after its commander. The nucleus of the unit was troops collected at Posen. It became the 89th Infantry Division in August 1915. The division was disbanded in 1919 during the demobilization of the German Army after World War I.

== Combat chronicle ==
The Westernhagen Division initially served on the Eastern Front. It fought in the Battle of Łódź in November/December 1914. From December 1914 to July 1915, it was in the line in the fighting on the Rawka and Bzura Rivers. In July and August 1915, it fought around Warsaw and then participated in the siege of Modlin Fortress. It was redesignated the 89th Infantry Division in August and then fought in the Battles of Neman and Vilnius. After the line stabilized, the division was in positional warfare until September 1916. It then went south to participate in the Romanian campaign. It fought in Romania until the armistice there in December 1917, and thereafter remained in the line securing the armistice. From May to November 1918, it was in the occupation troops in Romania. Allied intelligence rated the division as fourth class.

== Order of battle on formation ==
On February 6, 1915, the precursor of the division Truppenabteilung Westernhagen consisted of:

- Troop Detachment (Truppenabteilung) Westernhagen
  - I., II. & Ersatz Battalions/ Landwehr Infantry Regiment 8
  - Ersatz Regiment Keller (2 Btl)
  - Fortress MG Detachment 5 Thorn
  - 2nd & 7th Landsturm Squadrons, V A.K.
  - 2nd Ersatz Battery/ Field Artillery Regiment 56
  - Landsturm Battery, XVIII A.K.
  - 1 captured Russian battery
  - 4th Battery/ Reserve Foot Artillery Regiment 11 (Heavy Field Howitzers)
  - 2nd battery/ Reserve Foot Artillery Regiment 15 (10-cm Cannons)
  - 2nd Reserve Co./ Pioneer Battalion 17

The 89th Infantry Division was formed as an understrength division, with only two infantry regiments. It later received a third regiment, becoming a regular triangular division. The order of battle of the division on August 9, 1915, was as follows:

- 178. Infanterie-Brigade
  - Landwehr-Infanterie-Regiment Nr. 8
  - Infanterie-Regiment Nr. 375
- 2. Landsturm-Eskadron/V. Armeekorps
- 7. Landsturm-Eskadron/V. Armeekorps
- Feldartillerie-Abteilung Nr. 89
- 4.Kompanie/Reserve-Fußartillerie-Regiment Nr. 5
- 4.Kompanie/Reserve-Fußartillerie-Regiment Nr. 11
- 2.Kompanie/Reserve-Fußartillerie-Regiment Nr. 15
- 2.Reserve-Kompanie/Pionier-Bataillon Nr. 17

== Late-war order of battle ==
The division underwent a number of organizational changes over the course of the war. Cavalry was reduced and artillery and signals commands were formed. The order of battle on October 15, 1917, was as follows:

- 178.Infanterie-Brigade
  - Landwehr-Infanterie-Regiment Nr. 8
  - Infanterie-Regiment Nr. 333
  - Infanterie-Regiment Nr. 375
  - Maschinengewehr-Kompanie Nr. 89
- 4.Eskadron/Dragoner-Regiment von Wedel (Pommersches) Nr. 11
- Artillerie-Kommandeur 89
  - Feldartillerie-Regiment Nr. 89
  - I.Bataillon/Kgl. Bayerisches 4.Fußartillerie-Regiment
- 5.Kompanie/Pionier-Bataillon Nr. 26
- Divisions-Nachrichten-Kommandeur 89
