= 89ers =

German music duo

- Origin: Germany
- Genres: Eurodance; Hands up
- Years active: 2002–present
- Label: Drop Out
- Members: Paul Hutsch; Claudia Heymanns

89ers are a German music duo formed in 2002 and consisting of Paul Hutsch and Claudia Heymanns specializing in Hands-Up music in addition to Rock music elements which are contained in most of their songs, and they created covers of other Eurodance songs using this style.

== History ==
In 2002, they released their debut single “Wap Bam Boogie” and it was used in the compilation Future Trance Vol. 32. They also released a cover of “Kingston Town” which charted in number 1 in Austria and number 7 in The Netherlands. It was included on another Future Trance album by Polystar.

In 2003 they released “Funky Beatz” and a cover of “Words” F. R. David in 2005.

In 2006 they released Ritmo Forte, Higher Love and a cover of "Blue (Da Ba Dee)" with Rimini Rockaz.

In 2017, they released "Heart Ahead (Easter Rave Hymn 2k17)".

== Discography ==
Singles

- "Wap Bam Boogie/Ladies Time" (2002)
- "Kingston Town" (2003)
- "Funky Beatz" (2005)
- "Words" (2005)
- "Ritmo Forte" (2006)
- "Higher Love" (2006)
- "Blue (Da Ba Dee)" (2006)
- "The 89ers Boy" (2007)
- "Hold Me Now" (2008)
- "Jump with Me" (2009)
- "Human Nations" (2009)
- "It's Okay & Alright" (2010)
- "Go Go Go Go!" (2011)
- "Louder" (2011)
- "No Go Go Go!" (2021)
- "Just A Prank!" (2022)
- "Fly Away Children" (2023)
- "Party PPL" (2022)
- "Wilder Than A Hurricane" (2022)
- "We Own The Night" (2023)
- "Last Night A DJ Saved My Life" (2023)
- "Feeling Love Again (Explode)" (2023)
