= 74th (City of Glasgow) Heavy Anti-Aircraft Regiment, Royal Artillery =

74th (City of Glasgow) Heavy Anti-Aircraft Regiment, Royal Artillery 474 (City of Glasgow) Heavy Anti-Aircraft Regiment, Royal Artillery
- Cap Badge of the Royal Artillery (pre-1953)
- Active: 1 November 1938–14 November 1944; 1 January 1947–10 March 1955
- Country: United Kingdom
- Branch: Territorial Army
- Role: Air defence
- Size: Regiment
- Part of: Anti-Aircraft Command; Middle East Forces; Ninth Army
- Garrison/HQ: Glasgow
- Engagements: World War II

Commanders
- Notable commanders: Brevet Colonel John Muirhead, DSO, MC, TD

74th (City of Glasgow) Heavy Anti-Aircraft Regiment, Royal Artillery, was a Scottish air defence unit of Britain's Territorial Army raised in Glasgow just before World War II. During the war it served in Home Defence and in Middle East Command. It continued to serve in the postwar TA until 1955.

== Origin ==
During the period of international tension following the Munich Crisis of 1938, the War Office rapidly increased the size of Britain's anti-aircraft (AA) defences manned by part-time members of the Territorial Army (TA). A new regiment based in Glasgow was raised and commanded by Brevet Colonel John Muirhead, DSO, MC, TD, a Glasgow solicitor who had served in the signal service on the Western Front during World War I and later commanded Glasgow University Officers Training Corps (an artillery battery).

74th AA Brigade consisted of 230, 231 and 232 AA Batteries and the first officers' commissions (its official date of creation) were dated 1 November 1938. On 1 January 1939, in common with all other AA brigades, it was redesignated a regiment, and in September 1939 it gained its subtitle, becoming 74th (City of Glasgow) AA Regiment. Its regimental headquarters (RHQ) was at 34 West George Street, Glasgow. It formed part of 42nd Anti-Aircraft Brigade, newly-formed to take responsibility for the AA defence of Glasgow and the Clyde estuary.

== Mobilisation ==
In June 1939, as the international situation worsened, a partial mobilisation of TA units was begun in a process known as 'couverture', whereby each AA unit did a month's tour of duty in rotation to man selected AA and searchlight positions. On 24 August, ahead of the declaration of war, Anti-Aircraft Command was fully mobilised at its war stations.

On 1 June 1940 those AA regiments like 74th equipped with 3-inch or the newer 3.7-inch guns were termed Heavy Anti-Aircraft (HAA) to distinguish them from the new Light Anti-Aircraft (LAA) units being formed.

Although Glasgow like other British cities was soon to be heavily bombed during The Blitz, there as an urgent need to reinforce the AA defences of the British bases in Egypt after the entry of Italy into the war. 74th HAARegiment sailed round the Cape of Good Hope and landed at Port Tewfik in Egypt on 16 November 1940.

== Middle East ==
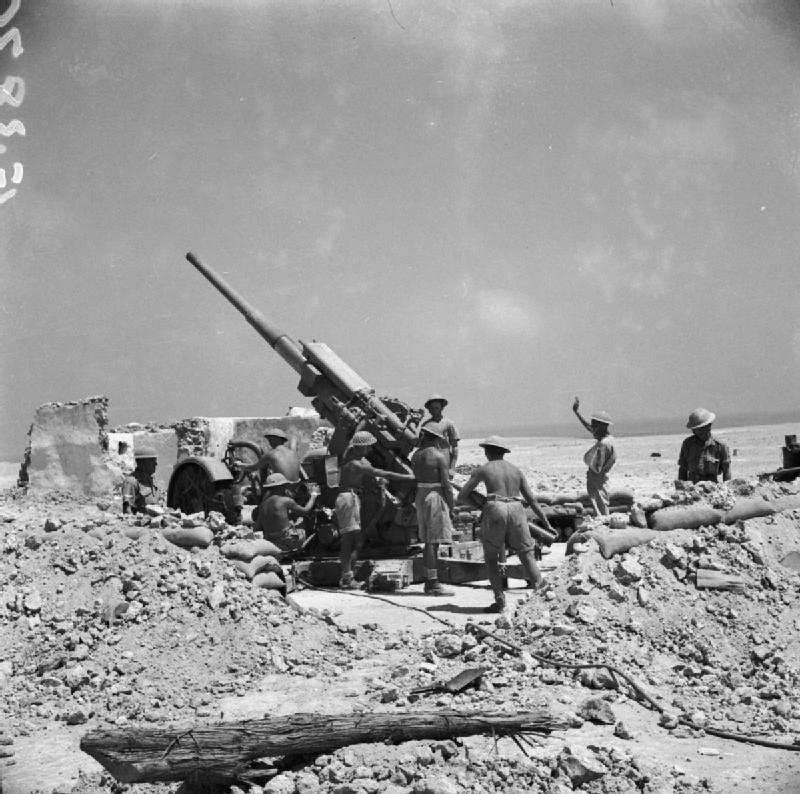
A 3.7-inch HAA gun in North Africa, 1941.

On 8 January 1941 the regiment came under the command of 2 AA Bde, newly arrived in Cairo. By the end of January 1941 the regiment under Col Muirhead was stationed in the Suez Canal Line of Communication Area under British Troops in Egypt, with 230 HAA Bty under Major L.C. Dunn detached to Port Said and 232 HAA Bty defending the Canal and Alexandria.

After the fall of Greece and Crete in the first part of 1941, bombers of the Luftwaffe 's Fliegerkorps X based there began raids against shipping at Suez, British bases in the Canal Zone, and the Canal itself (390 sorties in 34 night attacks from July to October). The naval base at Alexandria was also raided (274 sorties from mid-June to October). The AA defences were still comparatively weak and radar cover was poor, but the raids did not cause serious disruption. 74th HAA Regiment remained under 2 AA Bde during this period, with all 24 of its 3.7-inch guns deployed to defend Port Said and Port Fuad. Colonel Muirhead was promoted to command 2 AA Bde on 23 August 1941 but on 3 September he was transferred to command 4 AA Bde in Tobruk.

The regiment remained with Middle East Forces (MEF) in Egypt until the summer of 1942, when it moved to Ninth Army in Palestine. Here it came under the command of 20 AA Bde, which was responsible for the defence of ports and oil facilities at Haifa, Beirut, Lydda, Tripoli and for Cyprus. In January 1943 the regiment had 230 and 232 HAA Btys (16 x 3.7-inch guns) and 103 LAA Bty of 26th LAA Rgt (4 x 20 mm guns and 15 x Bofors 40 mm guns) under command, while 231 HAA Bty was detached under the command of 89th HAA Rgt advancing through Libya behind Eighth Army. On 1 April 1943, 231 HAA Bty transferred to 88th HAA Rgt and was replaced by 683 HAA Bty; this was the last new HAA battery formed during the war. In May 1943 the regiment was stationed on Cyprus, but at the end of the year it was back in Palestine under 1 AA Bde.

During 1944 the Eastern Mediterranean AA Group began to be run down: the air threat had diminished and the need to provide manpower for combat tasks elsewhere had become urgent. Surplus AA units in the region began to be disbanded. In June 1944, 74th HAA Rgt was in Alexandria under 17 AA Bde, but the following month that brigade was disbanded and 74th (City of Glasgow) HAA Regiment with 230, 232 and 683 HAA Btys passed into suspended animation on 14 November.

== Postwar ==
When the TA was reconstituted on 1 January 1947, the regiment reformed as 474 (City of Glasgow) HAA Regiment, with its RHQ at Yorkhill Parade drill hall, Glasgow. It formed part of 77 AA Bde (the wartime 51 AA Bde, based in Glasgow).

On 2 May 1950 the regiment absorbed 592 (Glasgow) LAA Rgt, without change of title or role. AA Command was disbanded on 10 March 1955 and there were wholesale amalgamations amongst its units. 474 HAA Regiment was amalgamated with the remaining units of 77 AA Bde, 483 (Blythswood) HAA Rgt and 591 (Cameronians) LAA Rgt. The combined unit was designated 445 (Cameronians) LAA Rgt, in which 474 Rgt formed R (Glasgow) Bty.

== Honorary Colonel ==
Alan Burns, 4th Baron Inverclyde, was appointed Honorary Colonel of the regiment on 11 January 1939.
