= 61st Light Anti-Aircraft Regiment, Royal Artillery =

61st Light Anti-Aircraft Regiment, RA
- Royal Artillery cap badge
- Active: 1 November 1940 – 1 August 1944
- Country: United Kingdom
- Branch: Territorial Army
- Role: Air Defence
- Size: Regiment
- Part of: 1st Armoured Division
- Engagements: Battle of Gazala

61st Light Anti-Aircraft Regiment was an air defence unit of Britain's Royal Artillery formed during the Second World War. Its component Territorial Army batteries, both from London, had already seen action in the Battle of France before the regiment was formed in 1940. It went on to serve with armoured formations in the Western Desert Campaign, including the Battle of Gazala. It was broken up in the Middle East in 1944 to provide infantry reinforcements for the Italian Campaign.

== Precursor unit ==
101st Light Anti-Aircraft/Anti-Tank Regiment, Royal Artillery, had been formed in February 1940 based on the regimental headquarters (RHQ) and two batteries from 60th (Royal Welch Fusiliers) Anti-Tank Regiment, Royal Artillery, together with two light anti-aircraft (LAA) batteries: 43 Bty from 11th (City of London Yeomanry) and 44 Bty from 12th (Finsbury Rifles) LAA Regiments. (The two LAA batteries were permitted to retain their original subtitles.) This composite unit, the first of its kind, was part of 1st Support Group (1st Sp Gp) in 1st Armoured Division, which was preparing to join the British Expeditionary Force (BEF) in France. The LAA units had been formed with old Lewis guns as AA Light machine guns, but were being re-equipped with Bofors 40 mm guns.

=== Battle of France ===
1st Armoured Division was ordered to France on 11 May when the Phoney War ended with the German invasion of the Low Countries. It began landing at Cherbourg and Le Havre on 15 May and was immediately ordered to advance and hold the crossings over the River Somme. It soon discovered that the Germans were already on the Somme and were rapidly closing on the Seine. 101st LAA/AT Regiment (with 20 2-pounder A/T guns and 96 Lewis guns, its Bofors guns not having arrived) was then ordered to seize the crossings over the Seine and hold them until the armour arrived (the infantry of 1st Sp Gp had been diverted to the defence of Calais and were not available).

Unsuccessful attempts by 1st Armoured and 51st (Highland) Division under French command to break through to the encircled BEF at Dunkirk led to fighting round Abbeville on 27–28 May. By early June the BEF had been evacuated, but fighting continued. On 4 June 1 Sp Gp provided flank protection for another attempt by 51st (H) Division to destroy the German bridgeheads at Abbeville, but the Germans had had two weeks to dig in, and the attack failed. Next day the Germans renewed their offensive, surrounding and capturing 51st (H) Division at St Valery-en-Caux, while 1st Sp Gp was 'out on a limb' facing German Panzer divisions and was driven back across the Seine. An operation began to evacuate the considerable numbers of British forces left in France from the western ports (Operation Aerial). The survivors of 1st Sp Gp were shipped out of Cherbourg on 16 June.

== 61st LAA Regiment ==
After returning to the UK, the remnants of 1st Armoured Division were stationed in Surrey in VII Corps, as part of the mobile reserve to defend against the feared German invasion (Operation Sealion). The division was one of the first in line for re-equipping.

While it refitted in the UK, 1st Sp Gp was reorganised, with 101st LAA/AT Rgt broken up at Godalming on 1 November to form 76th (Royal Welch Fusiliers) A/T Rgt and 61st LAA Regiment. The new LAA unit formed an extra battery, giving it the following organisation

- RHQ
- 43 (City of London Yeomanry) LAA Bty
- 44 (Finsbury Rifles) LAA Bty
- 197 LAA Bty

=== Operation Crusader ===
After completing its refitting and training in the UK, 1st Armoured Division sailed for the Middle East, 1st Sp Gp leaving on 27 September 1941, arriving in Egypt on 5 December and moving up into Libya for Eighth Army's Operation Crusader.

1st Armoured Division was committed to the offensive piecemeal before it had time to prepare for desert warfare. The first phase of Crusader ended in January 1942 and during the pause 1st Sp Gp relieved 7th Sp Gp. Eighth Army's policy was to use mobile Jock columns to patrol aggressively and harass the enemy; these were largely supplied by the support groups and included a detachment of towed Bofors guns, travelling with the auto-loaders filled and the gun-layers in their seats, ready for a 'snap' action. The inexperienced 1st Sp Gp found itself operating in appalling hummocky country, and many of its vehicles were not desert-worthy. General Erwin Rommel's counter-attack in late January broke through 1st Armoured Division's screen, the support group finding itself in difficulties in the bad country and under attack by Junkers Ju 87 Stuka divebombers. Only by withdrawal did it escape destruction.

=== Battle of Gazala ===
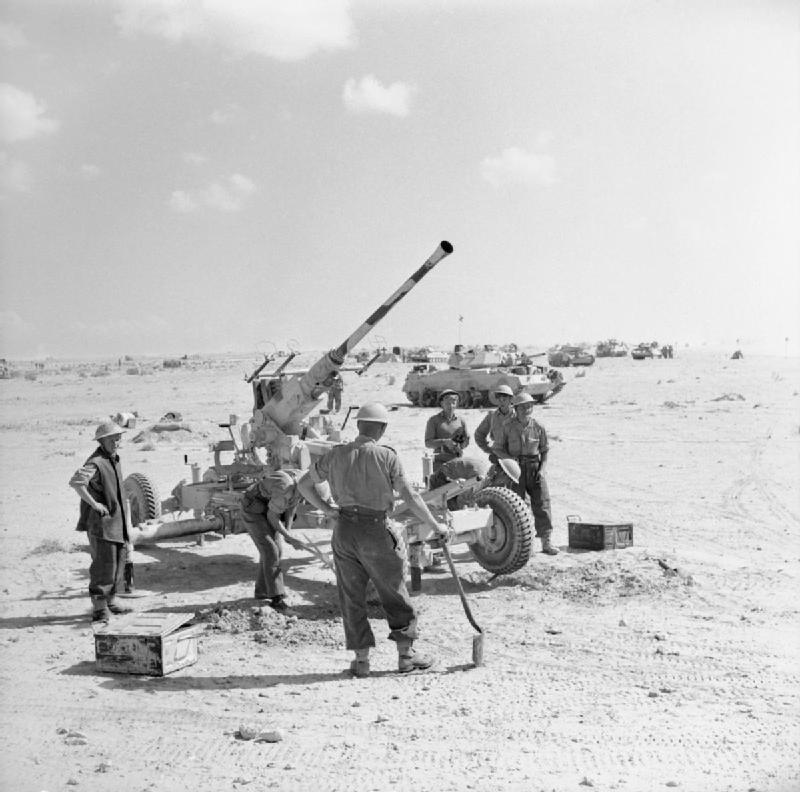
Bofors LAA gun being emplaced in the Western Desert, 1942.

Eighth Army retired to defensive positions at Gazala. These consisted of a series of fortified 'boxes', each defended by a brigade group, usually including an LAA battery deployed in separate Troop positions. RHQ of 61st LAA Regiment left 1st Sp Gp on 26 January, but its batteries remained providing Troops to the boxes. From March to July, 44 (Finsbury Rifles) LAA Bty was attached to 2nd Armoured Brigade Group, which largely operated independently of the rest of the division.

Rommel attacked the Gazala Line on 27 May, swinging round the two southern boxes. 2nd Armoured Bde, positioned behind the line, moved south and then attacked the German flank from the east, delivering some sharp blows. Over the following days it was involved in fierce tank battles in what became known as the Battle of the Cauldron. On 2 June the Luftwaffe began intense air attacks on the southernmost box at Bir Hakeim, defended by 1st Free French Brigade. Here, D Trp of 43 (CoLY) Bty under Lt Beachman distinguished itself in the defence of the box, which held out against ground and air attacks until ordered to withdraw on 10 June.

On 12 June Eighth Army made a fresh attempt to move its armoured brigades south to attack the enemy, but although 2nd Armd Bde achieved its objective, the day was costly for the British. The Luftwaffe was very active over the battlefield. Next day 2nd Armd Bde held onto its position, but that night some of the remaining boxes had to be evacuated. By 14 June Eighth Army began to withdraw to the Egyptian frontier with 1st Armd Division supporting 2nd South African Division in a rearguard action. The South African division was trapped in Tobruk and captured, but 1st Armd Division made it back to the desert south of Mersa Matruh inside Egypt (2nd Armd Bde had been completely withdrawn from the battle). But the Axis forces renewed their attacks on 27 June and Eighth Army Eighth Army was forced to retreat to its fall-back defences at El Alamein.

=== Alamein line ===
Once behind the Alamein defences the exhausted armoured divisions were withdrawn into reserve. Here 61st LAA Rgt and its batteries came under the command of 7th Armoured Division, which was engaged in the summer battles to hold the Alamein line.

However, the regiment had been withdrawn from the front line by the time the Second Battle of El Alamein was fought in October 1942. By January 1943, RHQ with 43 (CoLY) and 197 LAA Btys with 20 Bofors guns was stationed in Egypt under 21 AA Bde, defending the base areas of Cairo, Port Said, Suez and the Canal, while 44 (Finsbury Rifles) LAA Bty with 12 Bofors was under 18 AA Bde, which was stretched between Alexandria and Mersa Matruh, protecting landing grounds of the Desert Air Force. The whole regiment was under 21 AA Bde in the Canal Zone in May when the Tunisian campaign ended. In January 1944 it was under 17 AA Bde, still defending the North African supply ports of Tobruk, Benghazi and Tripoli.

=== Disbandment ===
Middle East Forces increasingly became a back area as the Italian campaign progressed. The Allied air forces had achieved air superiority in the Mediterranean theatre but at the same time British forces in Italy were suffering an acute manpower shortage. From April 1944 the number of AA regiments was reduced and their fit personnel converted to other roles, particularly infantry. 61st LAA Rgt was broken up in the Middle East on 2 August 1944 to provide infantry reinforcements for Eighth Army in Italy. Its number was twice re-used for postwar units of the Regular army.
