= Fable (disambiguation) =

A fable is a story intended to illustrate a moral.

Fable(s), The Fable(s), or A Fable may also refer to:

== Literature ==
- Aesop's Fables, a collection of fables from ancient Greece
- La Fontaine's Fables, several volumes by Jean de La Fontaine 1668–1694
- Fables, Ancient and Modern, a 1700 book by John Dryden
- Fables, several volumes by Ivan Krylov, beginning in 1809
- Schleicher's fable, an 1868 reconstructed Proto-Indo-European text by August Schleicher
- Fables, an 1885 cycle of satirical fairy tales by Mikhail Saltykov-Shchedrin
- A Fable, a 1954 novel by William Faulkner
- Fables (Lobel book), a 1980 children's picture book by Arnold Lobel
- Fables (comics), a Vertigo comic book series launched in 2002
- The Fable, a 2014 manga series by Katsuhisa Minami
- Business fable, a type of motivational fiction

== Music ==
=== Performers ===
- Fable (singer) (born 1995), English musician and singer
- The Fables (band), a Canadian Celtic rock group

=== Albums ===
- Fable (album), by Faye Wong, 2000
- A Fable (album), by Tigran Hamasyan, 2011
- Fables (England Dan & John Ford Coley album), 1972
- Fables (Jean-Luc Ponty album), 1985
- Immaculate Machine's Fables, by Immaculate Machine, 2007
- Fables, by 8stops7, 2012
- Fable, an EP by Switchblade Symphony, 1991
- Fable, an EP by Vallis Alps, 2017

=== Songs ===
- "Fable" (song), by Robert Miles, 1996
- "Fable", by Gigi Perez from At the Beach, in Every Life, 2025
- "Fables", by the Dodos from Time to Die, 2009
- "Fables", by Interpol from The Other Side of Make-Believe, 2022

== Video games ==
- Fable (1996 video game), an adventure game by Simbiosis Interactive
- Fable (video game series), a video game series by Lionhead Studios
  - Fable (2004 video game), the first of the series
  - Fable (2027 video game), reboot of the series

== Other uses ==
- Fable (The Wednesday Play), a 1965 British television play
- Fables, a cartoon series produced by Screen Gems 1939-1942
- Fable Studio, an AI startup company
- The Fable (El Greco), a 1580 painting by El Greco
- Fable, a social reading app owned and operated by Scribd
- Claude Fable, a large language model developed by Anthropic

== See also ==
- Aesop's Fables (disambiguation)
- Jugnuma: The Fable, a 2024 Indian film
