= For Gyumri =

2018 EP by Tigran Hamasyan

EP by Tigran Hamasyan
- Released: 2018
- Genre: Armenian folk music, jazz fusion and other styles
- Length: 29:34
- Label: Nonesuch Records

Tigran Hamasyan chronology
An Ancient Observer (2017)	For Gyumri (2018)	They Say Nothing Stays the Same (2019)

Professional ratings
Review scores
Source	Rating
All About Jazz	4/5 stars
PopMatters	7/10 stars
AllMusic	3.5/5 stars

For Gyumri is the 3rd extended play by Tigran Hamasyan and was released 16 February 2018. Tigran considers this EP a companion work to his 8th album An Ancient Observer, which was released the year before. Similarly to An Ancient Observer, this work is mostly solo piano with use of sparing vocals. The album is named after the city Gyumri and is where Tigran was born. This was his 3rd release on Nonesuch Records, with the two previous releases being An Ancient Observer and Mockroot. Tigran said that this album "... is an ode to my birthplace, the town that nourished my childhood world with great experiences and made me who I am". He performed this EP in Royce Hall at University of California, Los Angeles, and part of the proceeds went to the Children of Armenia Fund.

== Track listing ==
All tracks are written by Tigran Hamasyan.

No.	Title	Length
1.	"Aragatz"	4:22
2.	"Rays of Light"	3:47
3.	"The American"	6:34
4.	"Self - Portrait"	2:48
5.	"Revolving - Prayer"	12:03
Total length:		29:34
