= Manifeste =

2026 studio album by Tigran Hamasyan

Studio album by Tigran Hamasyan
- Released: February 6, 2026
- Recorded: Recorded at Yergatun Studio in Yerevan, Sierra Studio in Athens, CineLab in Moscow, UCLA recording studio at Evelyn & Mo Ostin Music centre in LA, National Centre of Chamber Music in Yerevan, Kerseboom studio between 2023-2025.
- Genre: Jazz
- Length: 73:33
- Label: Naïve Records

Tigran Hamasyan chronology
The Bird of a Thousand Voices (2024)	Manifeste (2026)

Manifeste is the twelfth studio album by Tigran Hamasyan. It was released by Naïve Records on 6 February 2026.

== Critical reception ==
PopMatters wrote; "This is a journey, profoundly personal and at the same time rooted in the world, seeking purpose within it, and for this it is moving as well as aurally rapturous." Jazzwise chose Manifeste as one of their best new jazz albums in April 2026, writing "few have the courage – and sheer headspace – to build such cathedrals of sound as Tigran Hamasyan." PostGenre writes "Manifeste is transportive in a highly unusual way. While drawing upon several distinct genres and reference points, in totality, the project provides as unique a sound as you’ll ever hear."

== Track listing ==
No.	Title	Length
1.	"Prelude for All Seekers" (featuring Matt Garstka)	4:31
2.	"Yerevan Sunrise"	4:56
3.	"Manifeste"	8:28
4.	"One Body, One Blood"	4:27
5.	"Seven Sorrows"	7:25
6.	"Years Passing (For Akram)"	2:29
7.	"Dardahan"	4:17
8.	"War Time Poem" (featuring Matt Garstka)	3:52
9.	"The Fire Child (Vahagn Is Born)"	4:05
10.	"Ultradance" (featuring Nate Wood)	6:23
11.	"Per Mané"	4:52
12.	"Window From One Heart to Another (For Rumi)"	2:45
13.	"A Eye (The Digital Leviathan)" (featuring Matt Garstka)	8:22
14.	"National Repentance Anthem"	6:41
Total length:		73:33

== Personnel ==
- Tigran Hamasyan - piano, bass, vocals, whistle
- Arman Mnatsakanyan - drums
- Arthur Hnatek - drums, electronic programming
- Artyom Manukyan - cello
- Asta Mamikonyan - vocals
- Daniel Melkonyan - trumpet
- Evan Marien - bass
- Hamin Honari - daf
- Marc Karapetian - bass
- Matt Garstka - drums
- Nate Wood - drums
- Nick Llerandi - guitar
