= Shadow Theater =

2013 studio album by Tigran Hamasyan

Studio album by Tigran Hamasyan
- Released: 2013
- Recorded: 2012
- Genre: Jazz, Progressive rock, Jazz Fusion, Armenian folk and other styles
- Length: 56:06
- Label: Verve / Universal

Tigran Hamasyan chronology
A Fable (2011)	Shadow Theater (2013)	Mockroot (2015)

Professional ratings
Review scores
Source	Rating
All About Jazz	5/5 stars
The Guardian	4/5 stars
AAA Music	5/5 stars
Uk Vibe	4/5 stars

Shadow Theater is the fifth album by Tigran Hamasyan published in 2013. The album contains 12 tracks and is a mix of several different styles, including jazz, jazz fusion, progressive rock, and Armenian folk. The album consists of tracks which he had composed many years ago, but not released. He then adapted and changed these tracks over around six years, until the album's release in 2013. This was Tigran's second release on Verve and was released in the US on Sunnyside the following year. The recording process took place in June 2012 at La Buissonne studio in Pernes-les-Fontaines, France. The album is dedicated to Tigran's uncle, Armen Hamasyan, who died in 2012.

== Track listing ==
All tracks are written by Tigran Hamasyan.

No.	Title	Length
1.	"The Poet"	4:17
2.	"Erishta"	4:39
3.	"Lament"	3:47
4.	"Drip"	4:11
5.	"The Year Is Gone"	2:38
6.	"Seafarer"	4:27
7.	"The Court Jester"	5:45
8.	"Pagan Lullaby"	3:18
9.	"Pt1 Collapse"	5:04
10.	"Pt2 Alternative Universe"	6:36
11.	"Holy"	5:21
12.	"Road Song"	6:43
Total length:		56:56

== Personnel ==
Musicians

- Tigran Hamasyan - Piano, Synth, Vocals (tracks 1 to 10, 12)
- Nate Wood - Drums, Percussion, Vocals (track 5)
- Areni Agbabian - Voice
- Sam Minaie - Bass Guitar (tracks 1, 2, 6, 8 to 12)
- Chris Tordini - Bass (tracks 3 to 5, 7), Voice (track 5)
- Ben Wendel - Bassoon (tracks 5, 11), Saxophone (tracks 1 to 4, 6 to 10)
- Xavier Phillips - Cello (tracks 2, 3, 6, 7)
- Jean-Marc Phillips-Varjabédian - Violin (tracks 3 to 12)

Production

- Composer, Producer, Arranger - Tigran Hamasyan
- Mastered by Bernie Grundman at Bernie Grundman Mastering, Hollywood, USA
- Additional help from David Kiledjian, Jan Bang, and Adam Samuel
