= LV =

LV, Lv or lv may refer to:

== Arts and entertainment ==
- Experience level or Level (video gaming), in video games and/or role-playing games
- LV (album), a live EP by the rock band Chickenfoot
- LV (musical duo) (2007–present), electronic music duo

== Businesses and organizations ==
- LEVEL (airline) (IATA code LV since 2017)
- Albanian Airlines (IATA code LV, 1991–2011)
- Lehigh Valley Railroad (AAR reporting mark LV)
- Liverpool Victoria, an English friendly society, commonly known as LV=
- Louis Vuitton, a French fashion house

== People ==
- Lü (surname) (吕), a Chinese family name, romanized Lv
- Luther Vandross (1951–2005), American R&B singer and songwriter
- L.V. (singer) (born 1960), American R&B singer
- LV (musical duo) (2007–present), electronic music duo

== Places ==
- Argentina (aircraft registration prefix LV)
- Las Vegas Valley the area in Nevada that includes:
  - Las Vegas, a city in Nevada
  - The Las Vegas Strip
  - other meanings see Las Vegas (disambiguation)
- Latvia (ISO 3166 country code LV)
- Lehigh Valley, an area in Pennsylvania
- Ljudski vrt, an association football stadium in Maribor, Slovenia

== Science and technology ==
=== Biology and medicine ===
- Left ventricle of the heart
  - Left ventricular Ventricular assist device (LV unit)

=== Computing ===
- .lv, the country code top level domain (ccTLD) for Latvia
- LabVIEW, a system-design platform and development environment
- LaserVision, a home video format and optical disc storage medium
- Logical volume, in computer storage

=== Other uses in science and technology ===
- Launch vehicle, a rocket
- Light value, in photography
- Lightvessel, a ship which acts as a lighthouse
- Livermorium, symbol Lv, a chemical element
- Low voltage

== Other uses ==
- 55 (number), in Roman numerals
- Latvian language (ISO 639-1 code LV)
- Luncheon Voucher, a UK meal voucher
- Lü (surname) or Lv, romanization of Chinese name
- Linking verb, a verb used to describe a subject
