= Aesop (disambiguation) =

Aesop was an ancient Greek storyteller known for his fables.

Aesop, AESOP, or Aesopus may also refer to:

- Aesop (brand), an Australian luxury skincare brand
- Aesop (record label), a British independent record label
- Aesopus (gastropod), a genus of marine gastropods
- Aesopus (historian), a Greek historian who wrote a life of Alexander the Great
- Association of European Schools of Planning, abbreviated AESOP
- Aesop, a pseudonym of mathematician Jim Propp
- Aesop Rock, an American rapper

== See also ==
- Aesop's Fables (disambiguation)
- Clodius Aesopus, a Roman tragedian
