= The Call Within =

2020 studio album by Tigran Hamasyan

Studio album by Tigran Hamasyan
- Released: August 28, 2020
- Length: 47:45
- Label: Nonesuch Records

Tigran Hamasyan chronology
They Say Nothing Stays the Same (2019)	The Call Within (2020)	StandArt (2022)

Singles from The Call Within
- 1. "Levitation 21" Released: 28 May 2020; 2. "New Maps" Released: 13 July 2020

Professional ratings
Review scores
Source	Rating
Radio13	4.5/5 stars
AllMusic	4/5 stars

The Call Within is the ninth album and fourth release on Nonesuch Records by Tigran Hamasyan, released 28 August 2020.

== Content ==
The Call Within is described by Hamasyan as taking inspiration from numerous sources, including contemporary and historical maps, poetry, Armenian culture, cinematography, and geometry, a mixture "blurring lines between historic reality and the imaginary world." In terms of the actual musical style, The Call Within features Hamasyan's standard mixture of progressive metal, jazz fusion, and Armenian folk, but with a few new twists. On several tracks, Hamasyan makes use of electronic keyboards, and the album features several guest features. Animals as Leaders guitarist Tosin Abasi is featured on the track "Vortex," providing guitar work, and vocalist Areni Agbabian and cellist Artyom Manukyan provide contributions to "Our Film".

The lead single and opening track "Levitation 21," was described as "combustible," with a "high-velocity forcefulness [that] sneaks up" on the listener. This style is kept throughout the tracklist, Marlbank's Daniel Stenson calling the album "a spectacular affair, darkly prog in places, feverishly intense." While Jeff Tamarkin of JazzTimes noted that the more progressive tracks like "Ara Resurrected" veered towards "bombast," he conceded that the writing was "crafty enough to keep it lean and moving" throughout.

However, The Call Within features several other styles. The track "Old Maps," featuring a children's choir from the Varduhi Art School, was described as "a mélange of pacifying notes and voices floating just out of reach," and "divine in nature." Critics noted that "[the album's] greatest strength is in the several divergent guises it assumes."

== Track listing ==
All tracks are written by Tigran Hamasyan.

No.	Title	Length
1.	"Levitation 21"	5:05
2.	"Our Film (feat. Areni Aghbabian and Artyom Manukyan)"	5:13
3.	"Ara Resurrected"	8:22
4.	"At a Post-Historic Seashore"	1:39
5.	"Space of Your Existence"	4:42
6.	"The Dream Voyager"	5:05
7.	"Old Maps (feat. Varduhi Art School Children’s Choir)"	2:30
8.	"Vortex (feat. Tosin Abasi)"	5:19
9.	"37 Newlyweds"	3:33
10.	"New Maps"	6:17
Total length:		47:45

== Personnel ==
- Tigran Hamasyan - Piano, keyboards, vocals, whistling, synthesisers, effects, electronic drums
- Evan Marien - electric bass
- Arthur Hnatek - drums
