= Mockroot =

2015 studio album by Tigran Hamasyan

Studio album by Tigran Hamasyan
- Released: 17 February 2015
- Genres: Armenian folk; jazz fusion; jazz metal; progressive rock
- Length: 58:17
- Label: Nonesuch

Tigran Hamasyan chronology
Shadow Theater (2013)	Mockroot (2015)	Luys i Luso (2015)

Professional ratings
Review scores
Source	Rating
All About Jazz	4/5 stars
The Guardian	3/5 stars
Sputnikmusic	4.5/5 stars
musicOMH	3/5 stars

Mockroot is the sixth studio album by the Armenian jazz pianist Tigran Hamasyan, released on 17 February 2015. It mixes traditional Armenian folk music with jazz and rock, in a jazz fusion style. The album features Hamasyan on synths, keyboard, and vocals; Sam Minaie on bass guitar; and Arthur Hnatek on drums and electronics. It was the first album he released on Nonesuch Records.

== Content ==
Mockroot consists of a variety of styles. The album opener, "To Love", and the following track, "Song for Melan and Rafik", are ballads featuring falsetto vocals over Hamasyan's piano.

The next few tracks, "Kars 1" and "Double-Faced", have a heavier sound, featuring breakdown sections one critic compared to those of Meshuggah. These are followed by the ballad "The Roads That Bring Me Closer to You" and the laid-back solo piano composition "Lilac". A similar balance between piano ballads and heavy djent-like tracks is followed for much of the tracklist, only interrupted by "Kars 2 (Wounds of the Centuries)", which takes a more minimalist approach.

The album includes heavy use of uncommon time signatures and frequent meter changes. The track "Song for Melan and Rafik" is in the time signature 42/16 and is arranged for a quintet instead of a trio. "Double Faced" features two separate pulses playing at the same time, described by Hamasyan as follows: "The idea was to use groupings of 5/16 over 8 bars of 4/4 in a way that it would make us feel like the 5/16 is the pulse, even though the entire song is in 4/4".

"Entertain Me" is in a time signature of 256/16, with a melody formed by a group of 35/16 played 7 times, followed by a single bar of 11/16. "To Negate" is in a time signature of 13/8, and the penultimate track, "The Grid", is composed in sections of 5, 5, 7, 5, 5, 5 sixteenth notes.

The final three named tracks, "To Negate", "The Grid", and "Out of the Grid", are among the heaviest on the album, described as "dissonant, post-modern, Armenian-infused post-bop, followed by angular djent-like jazz". "To Negate" has been described by Hamasyan as being "linked" to the opening track, "To Love", both songs having been inspired by the Armenian poet Bedros Tourian. The two tracks are in the same key, though "To Negate" is in "an odd, Armenian mode". The album closes with a hidden track in waltz time, which had been written in 2009 and played live for years prior to its inclusion on Mockroot.

Hamasyan has stated that "Armenia looms large throughout Mockroot." In addition to the general musical style, this is reflected by the fact that several track titles reference locations in current or historical Armenia. "Kars 1" and "Kars 2 (Wounds of the Centuries)" are named for Kars, a region in modern-day Turkey that Hamasyan cites as the ancestral home of his maternal grandparents. Similarly, "The Apple Orchard in Saghmosavanq" refers to Saghmosavanq, a monastery near Yerevan.

== Track listing ==
All tracks are written by Tigran Hamasyan.

No.	Title	Length
1.	"To Love"	2:06
2.	"Song for Melan and Rafik"	5:56
3.	"Kars 1"	5:26
4.	"Double-Faced"	5:30
5.	"The Roads That Bring Me Closer to You"	4:16
6.	"Lilac"	4:10
7.	"Entertain Me"	3:19
8.	"The Apple Orchard in Saghmosavanq"	4:22
9.	"Kars 2 (Wounds of the Centuries)"	1:34
10.	"To Negate"	5:17
11.	"The Grid"	5:56
12.	"Out of the Grid"	10:25
Total length:		58:17

== Personnel ==
Adapted from album credits

Musicians

- Tigran Hamasyan – piano, vocals, keyboards, synths, sound effects
- Sam Minaie – bass guitar
- Arthur Hnatek – drums, live electronics
- Gayanée Movsisyan – vocals (track 5)
- Areni Agbabian – vocals (track 2)
- Ben Wendel – saxophone (track 2)
- Chris Tordini – bass guitar (track 2)
- Nate Wood – drums (track 2)

Production

- Cover artwork – Vahram Muradyan
- Producer, composer, arranger – Tigran Hamasyan
- Photography – MirzOyan
- Recording and mixing – Antoine Gaillet
- Assistant engineer – Clément Gariel
- Mastered by Nate Wood

Recorded at Studio de Meudon, Meudon, France
