= An Ancient Observer =

2017 studio album by Tigran Hamasyan

Studio album by Tigran Hamasyan
- Released: March 31, 2017
- Genre: Armenian folk music and other styles
- Length: 44:57
- Label: Nonesuch Records

Tigran Hamasyan chronology
Luys i Luso (2015)	An Ancient Observer (2017)	For Gyumri (2018)

Professional ratings
Review scores
Source	Rating
The Guardian	3/5 stars
DownBeat	4.5/5 stars

An Ancient Observer is the 8th album by Tigran Hamasyan released 31 March 2017. Two of the tracks on the album are developments of traditional Armenian melodies and all tracks have influences from Armenian folk music. Tigran also draws inspiration from Jazz and Rock music, as well as the natural landscape of Mount Ararat. This was Tigran's second album on Nonesuch Records. The album is mostly solo piano, however, there is sparing use of electronics and vocals. Tigran considers his next release, the EP For Gyumri, to be a companion work to this album.

== Track listing ==
All tracks are written by Tigran Hamasyan.

No.	Title	Length
1.	"Markos and Markos"	5:38
2.	"The Cave of Rebirth"	5:39
3.	"New Baroque 1"	1:50
4.	"Nairian Odyssey"	11:00
5.	"New Baroque 2"	1:36
6.	"Etude No. 1"	2:08
7.	"Egyptian Poet"	2:21
8.	"Fides Tua"	4:51
9.	"Leninagone"	3:56
10.	"Ancient Observer"	5:58
Total length:		44:57
