= Luys i Luso =

Studio album by Tigran Hamasyan
- Released: 4 September 2015
- Recorded: October 2014
- Genre: Armenian sacred music, Armenian folk
- Length: 1:16:04
- Label: ECM
- Producer: Manfred Eicher

Tigran Hamasyan chronology
Mockroot (2015)	Luys i Luso (2015)	An Ancient Observer (2017)

Professional ratings
Review scores
Source	Rating
Cutting Edge	4/5 stars
Gaffa	6/6 stars
The Guardian	4/5 stars
The Irish Times	4/5 stars
PopMatters	9/10 stars
RTÉ	4/5 stars
Télérama	5/5 stars

Luys i Luso (Armenian: լույս ի լուսո, "Light from the Light") is the seventh album by Armenian pianist Tigran Hamasyan. It was released to commemorate the 100th anniversary of the Armenian genocide.

== Production and Inspiration ==
Luys i Luso is album is arranged for piano, prepared piano and voices. The album was performed by Tigran Hamasyan on piano, with vocals sung by the Yerevan State Chamber Choir and conducted by Harutyun Topikyan. The album was recorded in October 2014 and was produced by the founder of ECM Records, Manfred Eicher. In writing this album, Hamasyan spent three years collecting and arranging Armenian sacred music which ranged from 5th century sharakans to early 20th century hymns. He layered such arranged music with improvised piano and vocal percussion.

For Hamasyan, Luys i Luso is "a musical world for me in which Armenian sacred music tradition, contemporary classical composition and improvisation come together". This album also represents the story of Christ by combining the three verses of "Surb Astvats" also known as "The Three Divine". Hamasyan also uses the "Patriarchal Ode" by Komitas which illustrates the history of the Armenian church, the struggles and compassion of Father Khrimian.

In recording the album, Hamasyan later said in an interview that God had intervened in the recording:

It was the last day of recording, and we had to record this very serious piece called New Flower [Nor Tsaghik]. It's a long, complicated piece, and as soon as we started recording, all the lights went off. Right around the corner there was an old, 17th-century church, and while we waited for the power to come back, the whole choir walked there, and some of the girls sang in the church. It was a spiritual moment. It was God saying that if you're recording sacred music for four days, you've got to visit a church at least once. After that, everybody was different. It had a big impact on us.

== Release ==
Luys i Luso was released on 4 September and 2 October 2015 in the United States.

== Performance ==
As part of the commemoration of the Armenian Genocide, the work was performed in 100 churches around the world. Hamasyan had also performed the work at churches located in Armenia and surrounding countries before the release of the work, however, he refused performing in Turkey. He said that this was because he could not "... go somewhere where people killed my great-grandfather and his sisters ... [and] play in front of a crowd that still denies that they killed my family". However, when asked to perform this work in towns that used to be in Armenia but are now in Turkey, he went there to perform. Although Hamasyan was encouraged by his Turkish fans to perform in Turkey, there was opposition from others. This included the mayor of Kars, Murtaza Karaçanta, who had made racist remarks about Hamasyan and the other performers, and right-wing Turkish groups, such as Grey Wolves, who had made threats against the performers. Because of these threats the performers were given a police escort whilst in Turkey.

== Art project ==
An art project, also called Luys i Luso, was commissioned by Hamasyan which explores and documents the creation and performance of the album. The finished art installation used large digital screens and the music from the album in a 35-minute exhibition which explores the album's creation, performance, and the tour of the 100 churches around the world. The installation was displayed in Depo (an art gallery in Istanbul) over six days. It was later hosted by The Armenian General Benevolent Union, BRIC Arts Media, and SKLAD in Plovdiv. The installation was also shown in Little Armenia, Los Angeles, accompanied by a live performance by Hamasyan.

== Track listing ==
All tracks written or arranged from a tune by Tigran Hamasyan. English translations from Between Sound and Space, unless otherwise noted:

No.	Title	Length
1.	"Ov Zarmanali" (English: O Amazing Mystery. - Grigor III Pahlavuni)	1:26
2.	"Ankanim Araji Qo" (English: I Kneel Before You - Mesrop Mashtots)	5:09
3.	"Ov Zarmanali (Var. 1)"	13:10
4.	"Hayrapetakan Maghterg" (English: Patriarchal Ode - Komitas)	3:52
5.	"Bazum En Qo Gtutyunqd" (English: Your Mercy Is Boundless - Mesrop Mashtots)	6:43
6.	"Nor Tsaghik" (English: New Flower - Nerses Shnorhali)	7:38
7.	"Hayrapetakan Maghterg (Var. 1)"	1:45
8.	"Hayrapetakan Maghterg (Var. 2)"	4:26
9.	"Havoun Havoun" (English: The Bird, The Bird was Awake - Grigor Narekatsi)	4:35
10.	"Voghormea Indz Astvats" (English: God, Have Mercy upon Me - Mesrop Mashtots)	9:34
11.	"Sirt Im Sasani" (English: My Heart is Trembling! - Mkhitar Ayrivanetsi)	3:46
12.	"Surb Astvats" (English: Holy God - Komitas)	5:46
13.	"Sirt Im Sasani (Var. 1)"	4:04
14.	"Orhnyal E Astvats" (English: Blessed is God - Komitas)	4:10
Total length:		76:04
