= Saghmosavan =

Village in Aragatsotn, Armenia

Saghmosavan Սաղմոսավան
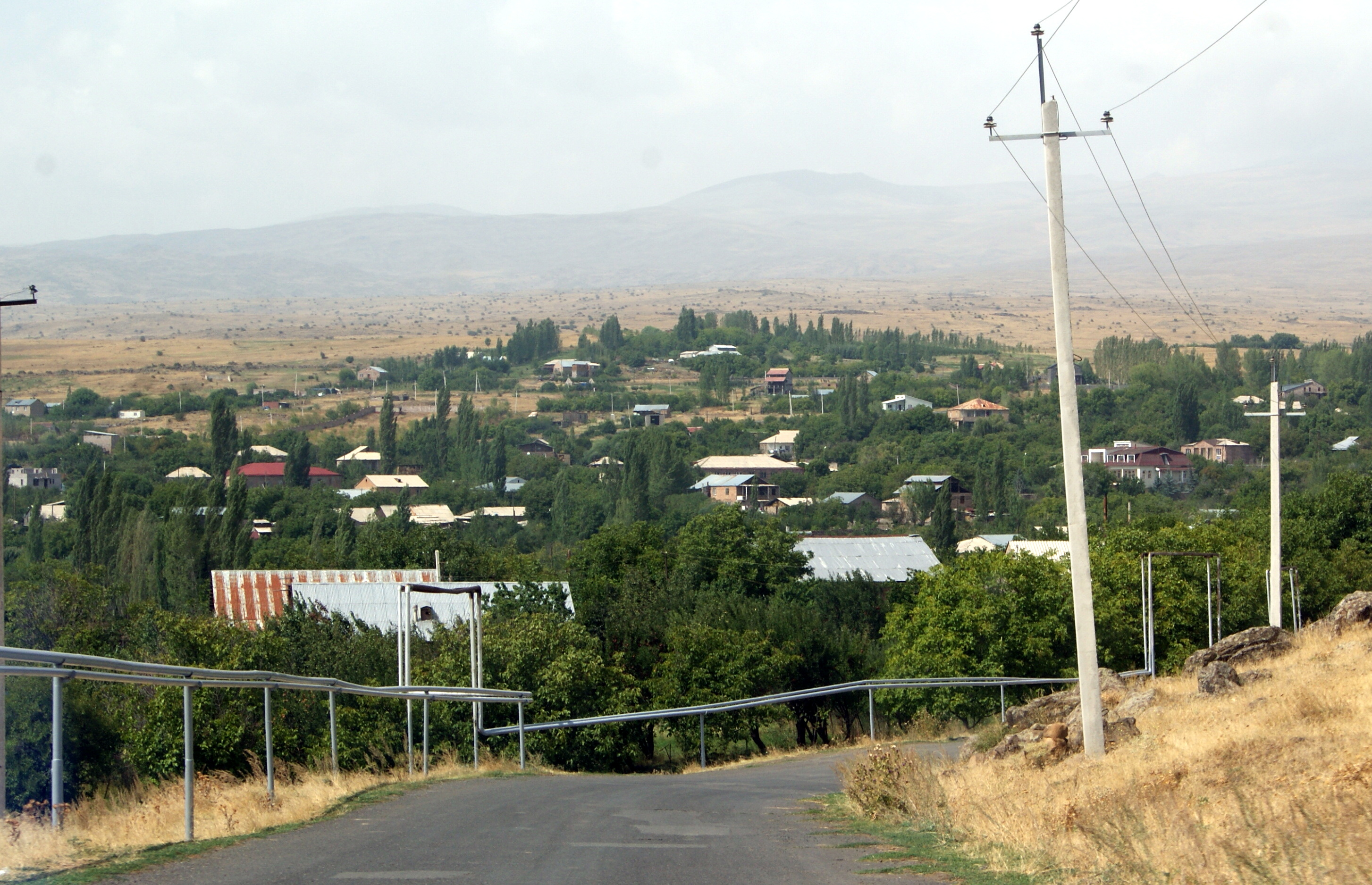

- Location within Armenia Location within Aragatsotn
- Coordinates: 40°23′09″N 44°23′38″E
- Country: Armenia
- Province: Aragatsotn
- Municipality: Ashtarak

Population (2011)
  - Total: 158
- Time zone: UTC+4
  - Summer (DST): UTC+5

Saghmosavan (Armenian: Սաղմոսավան) is a village in the Ashtarak Municipality of the Aragatsotn Province of Armenia. The town is the site of the Saghmosavank Monastery (the "Monastery of Psalms") with Saint Sion church, built in 1215.

== Demographics ==
Population change:

Year	1831	1873	1886	1931	1959	1970	1979	1979	2001	2011
Population	131	166	238	155	194	133	78	87	198	158
