= Ancient Mechanisms =

Studio album by LV and Tigran Hamasyan
- Released: 9 October 2015
- Recorded: February 2014
- Length: 47:23
- Label: Brownswood Recordings

Professional ratings
Review scores
Source	Rating
Resident Advisor	2.9/5 stars
Clash Music	6/10 stars

Ancient Mechanisms is the 4th album by LV, which was created in collaboration with Tigran Hamasyan and was released 9 October 2015. LV is a duo of Si Williams and Will Horrocks, who met when they were both studying at University College London. Critics said that Tigran and LV did not gel well together, leaving the music sounding disjointed. LV and Tigran first met when they were performing at a Maida Vale session in 2012 for Gilles Peterson's final BBC Radio 1 show.

== Track listing ==
No.	Title	Length
1.	"Carillon"	2:24
2.	"Ruiselede feat. Tigran Hamasyan"	5:05
3.	"Gravity Escapement"	1:42
4.	"Transition"	4:18
5.	"Quick Return"	0:30
6.	"Hammers And Roses feat. Tigran Hamasyan"	3:35
7.	"Dar Souiri"	5:50
8.	"Broken Movement"	1:15
9.	"Infinite Spring feat. Tigran Hamasyan"	4:44
10.	"Dansaetstraat"	2:24
11.	"Detent"	1:09
12.	"Jump And Rech feat. Tigran Hamasyan"	4:24
13.	"Balance Spring"	3:49
14.	"Yarimo feat. Tigran Hamasyan"	6:14
Total length:		47:23
