= StandArt =

2022 studio album by Tigran Hamasyan

Studio album by Tigran Hamasyan
- Released: April 29, 2022
- Recorded: April 11–13, 2021 at Stagg Street Studio, Los Angeles, CA
- Genre: Jazz, bebop
- Length: 47:53
- Label: Nonesuch Records

Tigran Hamasyan chronology
The Call Within (2020)	StandArt (2022)	The Bird of a Thousand Voices (2024)

StandArt is the tenth studio album by Tigran Hamasyan. It was released by Nonesuch Records on 29 April 2022. It is Hamasyan's first covers album, and features eight jazz standards and one original composition.

== Critical reception ==
Professional ratings
Review scores
Source	Rating
All About Jazz	3/5 stars
DownBeat	4.5/5 stars
Financial Times	4/5 stars
Jazzwise	4/5 stars
PopMatters	9/10
The Times	3/5 stars

The Times wrote; "Standards are those tunes mostly borrowed from the Great American Songbook whose harmonic richness and rhythmic flexibility make them ideal for improvising. No matter how fashions in jazz change, they remain popular, yet Tigran Hamasyan certainly tests their durability on this intriguing, challenging album." PopMatters wrote; "The production is clean and loud, and Hamasyan's dynamic playing sometimes sends notes aggressively to the center of the mix. This is jazz for people who like to sit at the edge of their seats." Jazzwise wrote; "It’s perhaps the most integrated example of his highly original personal language that’s evolved through a high level, action-packed career over the past decade."

== Track listing ==
No.	Title	Writer(s)	Length
1.	"De-Dah"	Elmo Hope	4:16
2.	"I Didn't Know What Time It Was"	Richard Rodgers; Lorenz Hart	7:13
3.	"All The Things You Are" (featuring Mark Turner)	Jerome Kern; Oscar Hammerstein II	5:45
4.	"Big Foot" (featuring Joshua Redman)	Charlie Parker	7:30
5.	"When A Woman Loves A Man"	Bernard Hanighen; Gordon Jenkins; Johnny Mercer	4:40
6.	"Softly, As In A Morning Sunrise"	Sigmund Romberg; Oscar Hammerstein II	4:56
7.	"I Should Care" (featuring Ambrose Akinmusire)	Axel Stordahl; Paul Weston; Sammy Cahn	3:50
8.	"Invasion During an Operetta" (featuring Ambrose Akinmusire)	Tigran Hamasyan; Ambrose Akinmusire; Matt Brewer; Justin Brown	2:26
9.	"Laura"	David Raksin; Johnny Mercer	6:28
Total length:			47:53

== Personnel ==
- Tigran Hamasyan - piano
- Matt Brewer - bass
- Justin Brown - drums
- Mark Turner - saxophone (track 3)
- Joshua Redman - saxophone (track 4)
- Ambrose Akinmusire - trumpet (tracks 7, 8)
