= Arthur Hnatek =

Swiss drummer (born 1990)

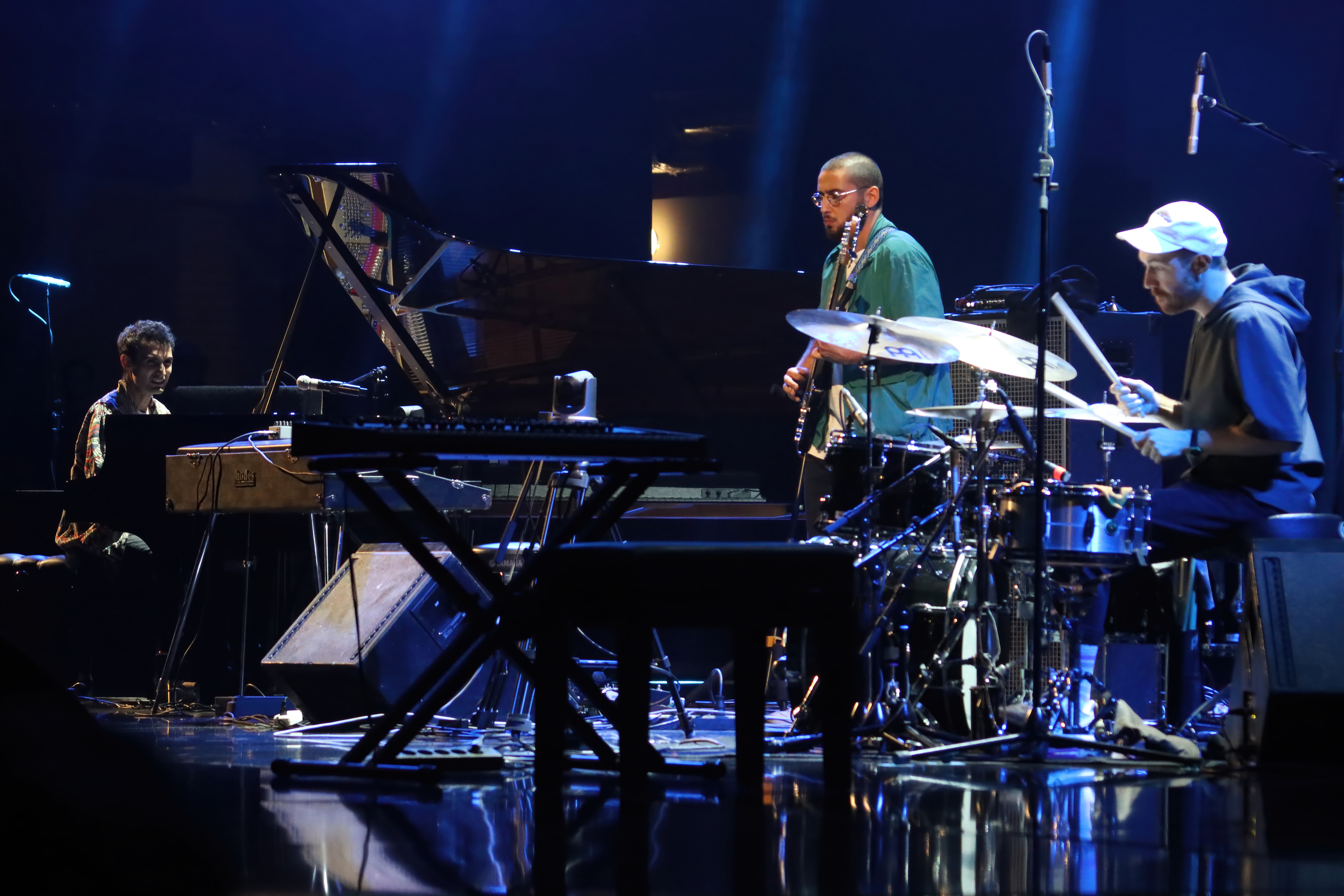
- Hnatek playing with the Hamasyan Trio

Background information
- Born: July 10, 1990 (age 36); Switzerland
- Genres: Jazz, electronic, experimental
- Occupations: Drummer, composer, electronic musician
- Years active: 2013–present
- Label: Mouthwatering Records
- Website: www.arthurhnatek.com

Arthur Hnatek (born July 10, 1990) is a Swiss drummer, composer, and electronic musician known for blending jazz, improvisation, and electronic music. His work spans multiple genres, from acoustic jazz to experimental club music. He was awarded a Swiss Music Prize in 2022. Hnatek was a student at The New School for Jazz and Contemporary Music in New York City under the guidance of musicians such as Nate Wood, Mark Guiliana, Ari Hoenig and Robert Sadin among others.

== Musical style and influence ==
Hnatek's music is characterised by intricate rhythms, experimental textures, and a fusion of acoustic and electronic sounds. His work is often associated with modern jazz, avant-garde improvisation, and club music, expanding on conventional drumming techniques within these genres and is considered by one critic as "undoubtedly one of the world's finest rhythmicists". Active as an electronica artist, Arthur released his first album in 2024, published by Mouthwatering Records, which explored the boundaries between improvisation and functional club music with his drums and modular synths.

Hnatek's electronic music has been heard on BBC Radio 6 Music and has been featured and discussed by Mary Anne Hobbs, Tom Ravenscroft and Gilles Peterson. His music has been played in clubs around the world, including on Laurent Garnier's turntables and during his show on FIP (radio station). He has collaborated with Stenny (Ilian Tape), TAUT, Noémi Büchi (-ous), Ripperton, and Tillman Ostendarp.

In 2020, the Arthur Hnatek trio released their first album Static, which was described as "a timely reflection on reduction and humility with a mindfulness that is on point right now" by Debra Richards. One critic stated that it established Hnatek as a part of the Swiss drumming tradition, sharing traits in his composition with Aphex Twin or Squarepusher.

As a drummer, Hnatek has been recognised for his work with Tigran Hamasyan, contributing to both The Call Within and Mockroot. Hnatek accompanied the Erik Truffaz quartet on tour from 2016 to 2020. Hnatek has collaborated with artists such as Sophie Hunger on her score for My Life as a Courgette, Dhafer Youssef, Vincent Peirani and Donny McCaslin.

He holds a position as member of faculty at the ZHDK (Zurich University of the Arts). Hnatek is a long time collaborator with cymbals brand Meinl Percussion and was involved with creating prototypes, as well as offering help with the design of the Nano Sticks. He has endorsed Tama Drums.

== Discography ==
=== As solo artist ===
- 2026: Undertwo – EP (Hessle Audio)
- 2024: Adrift – Album (Mouthwatering Records)
- 2022: Why So Much Hope – EP
- 2021: Polychroma – EP (feat TAUT)
- 2021: Ritual – EP (feat TAUT)
- 2020: SWIMS – EP

=== As leader ===
- 2023: Apnea – EP – Arthur Hnatek Trio (Bridge The Gap)
- 2020: Static – Album – Arthur Hnatek Trio Whirlwind Records
- 2020: Melismetiq Live in New York – Melismetiq (feat Shai Maestro, Ari Bragi Karason and Rick Rosato)
- 2017: Melismetiq – Melismetiq (feat Shai Maestro, Ari Bragi Karason and Rick Rosato)
- 2013: The arc lite suite

=== As sideman ===
With Tigran Hamasyan

- 2021: The Call Within – Nonesuch Records
- 2015: Mockroot with Tigran Hamasyan – Nonesuch Records

With Erik Truffaz

- 2019: Lune Rouge – Warner Records
- 2016: Doni Doni – Warner Parlophone
