= A Fable (album) =

2011 studio album by Tigran Hamasyan

Studio album by Tigran Hamasyan
- Released: 2011
- Recorded: February 2010
- Genre: Armenian folk music, jazz and other styles
- Length: 56:07
- Label: Verve and EmArcy

Tigran Hamasyan chronology
Aratta Rebirth: Red Hail (2009)	A Fable (2011)	Shadow Theater (2013)

Professional ratings
Review scores
Source	Rating
Jazzwise	4/5 stars
The Guardian	3/5 stars
All About Jazz	4/5 stars
The Daily Telegraph	4/5 stars
Armenian Pulse	5/5 stars

A Fable is the fourth album by Tigran Hamasyan released in February 2011. Tigran uses traditional Armenian hymns, Armenian poetry and Armenian folk music as the basis for the tracks on the album. The album also draws influences from jazz, rock and pop. Tigran in an interview said that he chose the name of the album "... because each composition tells a story ... [and] people can relate to fables because they are both simple, yet deep." He only used his first name on this album's release, but has used his full name in subsequent albums.

== Track listing ==
All tracks are written by Tigran Hamasyan.

No.	Title	Length
1.	"Rain Shadow"	1:36
2.	"What The Waves Brought"	6:30
3.	"The Spinners" (G.I. Gurdjieff & T. De Hartmann)	2:58
4.	"Illusion"	1:31
5.	"Samsara"	5:33
6.	"Longing" (lyrics taken from Hovhannes Tumanyan's "Quatrians")	5:06
7.	"Carnival"	2:45
8.	"The Legend Of The Moon" (based on the poetry of Gegham Saryan)	5:32
9.	"Someday My Prince Will Come" (F. Churchill & L. Morey)	3:39
10.	"Kakavik (The Little Partridge)" (based on an Armenian folk song collected by Komitas)	5:56
11.	"A Memory That Became A Dream"	2:37
12.	"A Fable"	5:05
13.	"Mother, Where Are You?" (Armenian medieval Hymn)	2:26
14.	"Looking For The Block"	5:00
Total length:		56:07
