= The Bird of a Thousand Voices =

2024 studio album by Tigran Hamasyan

Studio album by Tigran Hamasyan
- Released: 30 August 2024
- Recorded: Benaji Studio
- Genre: Progressive rock, Jazz fusion, Armenian folk
- Length: 91:05
- Label: Naive Records

Tigran Hamasyan chronology
StandArt (2022)	The Bird of a Thousand Voices (2024)	Manifeste (2026)

The Bird of a Thousand Voices is the eleventh studio album by Tigran Hamasyan. It was released by Naive Records on 30 August 2024. The album is based on the Armenian folk tale "Hazaran Blbul" (also known as "The Bird of a Thousand Voices").

Professional ratings
Review scores
Source	Rating
Marlbank.net	4/5 stars
Analogplanet.com	8/10 stars

== Video game ==
A video game with the same name was created and released. The game is a 2D platformer where the player plays as Prince Areg from the folk tale, and features music from the album.

== Track listing ==
All music is composed by Tigran Hamasyan.

No.	Title	Length
1.	"The Kingdom"	3:29
2.	"The Curse (Blood of an Innocent Is Spilled)"	6:49
3.	"The Bird of a Thousand Voices"	3:51
4.	"Areg's Calling (Towards the World Above)"	5:15
5.	"The Path of No Return"	3:12
6.	"The Quest Begins"	4:31
7.	"Areg and Manushak (He Saw Her Reflection in the Water)"	4:04
8.	"The Saviour Is Condemned"	2:00
9.	"Guidance (Areg Meets Zaman)"	2:27
10.	"Flaming Horse and the Thunderbolt Sword (From the Depths of the Sea)"	3:45
11.	"Red, White and Black Worlds"	6:12
12.	"Bells of Memory"	2:09
13.	"Only the One Who Brought the Bird Can Make It Sing"	5:19
14.	"Prophecy of a Sacrifice"	4:22
15.	"The Demon of Akn Anatak"	2:15
16.	"Temptations (Follow the Luminous Feather)"	2:40
17.	"Forty Days in the Realm of the Bottomless Eye (He Brings Light into the Soil of Evil)"	3:52
18.	"He Refuses to Be Immortal (The Goddess of Paradise Gives Him the Enchanting Bird)"	4:26
19.	"The Return (Through Vast Deserts, Seas and Dark Mountains)"	3:05
20.	"Betrayed by Brothers"	1:51
21.	"The Well of Death and Resurrection"	4:36
22.	"Sing Me a Song When You Will Be at the Place Where All Is Bliss"	2:32
23.	"The Eternal Bird Sings and the Garden Blooms Again"	6:00
24.	"Postlude: After Seven Winters"	2:23
Total length:		91:05

== Personnel ==
- Tigran Hamasyan - Piano/synths/vocals
- Areni Agbabian - Vocals
- Sofia Jernberg - Vocals
- Vahram Sargsyan - Vocals
- Layth Sidiq - Violin
- Marc Karapetian - Electric bass
- Nate Wood - Drums/Electric bass
