= Tigran Hamasyan =

Armenian jazz pianist and composer (born 1987)

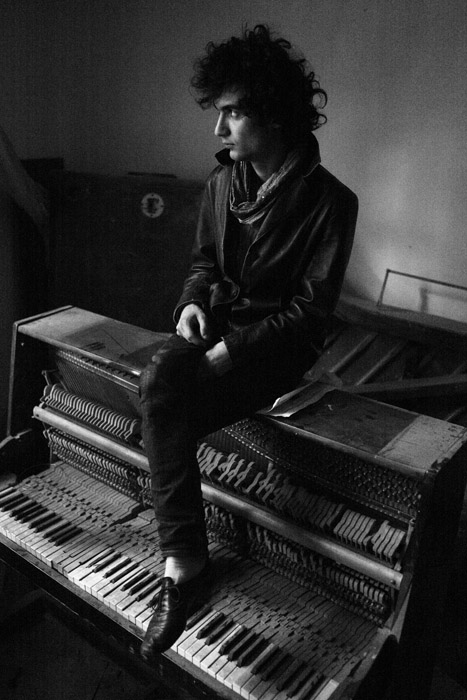
- Hamasyan in 2009

Background information
- Born: 17 July 1987 (age 39); Leninakan, Armenian SSR (now Gyumri, Armenia)
- Genres: Jazz; jazz fusion; progressive rock; Armenian folk
- Occupations: Musician; pianist; composer
- Instruments: Piano; vocals
- Years active: 2001–present
- Labels: Nonesuch; Naïve; Verve
- Website: tigranhamasyan.com

Tigran Hamasyan (Armenian: Տիգրան Համասյան; born 17 July 1987) is an Armenian jazz pianist, singer, whistler, and composer. He plays mostly original compositions, strongly influenced by the Armenian folk tradition, often using its scales and modalities. In addition to this folk influence, Hamasyan is influenced by American jazz traditions and, to some extent, as on his album Red Hail, by progressive rock. His solo album, A Fable, is most strongly influenced by Armenian folk music. Even in his most overt jazz compositions and renditions of well-known jazz pieces, his improvisations often contain embellishments based on scales from Middle Eastern and Southwest Asian traditions.

== Early life ==
Hamasyan was born in Gyumri, Armenia. His ancestors were from the Kars region in modern-day Turkey. His father was a jeweler and his mother designed clothes. At the age of three, he began to play melodies on his family's piano, and he went to a music school from the age of six. As a young child, he dreamed of being a thrash metal guitarist.

He studied jazz from the age of nine, then tried to incorporate local folk melodies into jazz-form improvisations when in his teens. At this stage, Hamasyan was influenced by Armenian composers Arno Babajanian and Avet Terterian. He, together with his parents and sister, moved to Yerevan when he was around 10, and then to California when he was 16. He currently resides in Yerevan, Armenia.

== Career ==
Hamasyan recorded his first album, World Passion, at the age of 18. In 2013, he spent a lot of time in Armenia, which helped develop his interest in its folk music. He was the leader of the "Aratta Rebirth", with which he performed Red Hail. On 29 April 2022, Nonesuch Records released Hamasyan's first album of American standards: StandArt. The project was recorded in the spring of 2021 in Los Angeles and includes 9 songs from the 1920s through the 1950s, by Richard Rodgers, Charlie Parker, Jerome Kern, David Raksin, and others. Bassist Matt Brewer, drummer Justin Brown, trumpeter Ambrose Akinmusire, saxophonist Joshua Redman, and saxophonist Mark Turner collaborated with the pianist and contributed to the recording.

== Awards ==
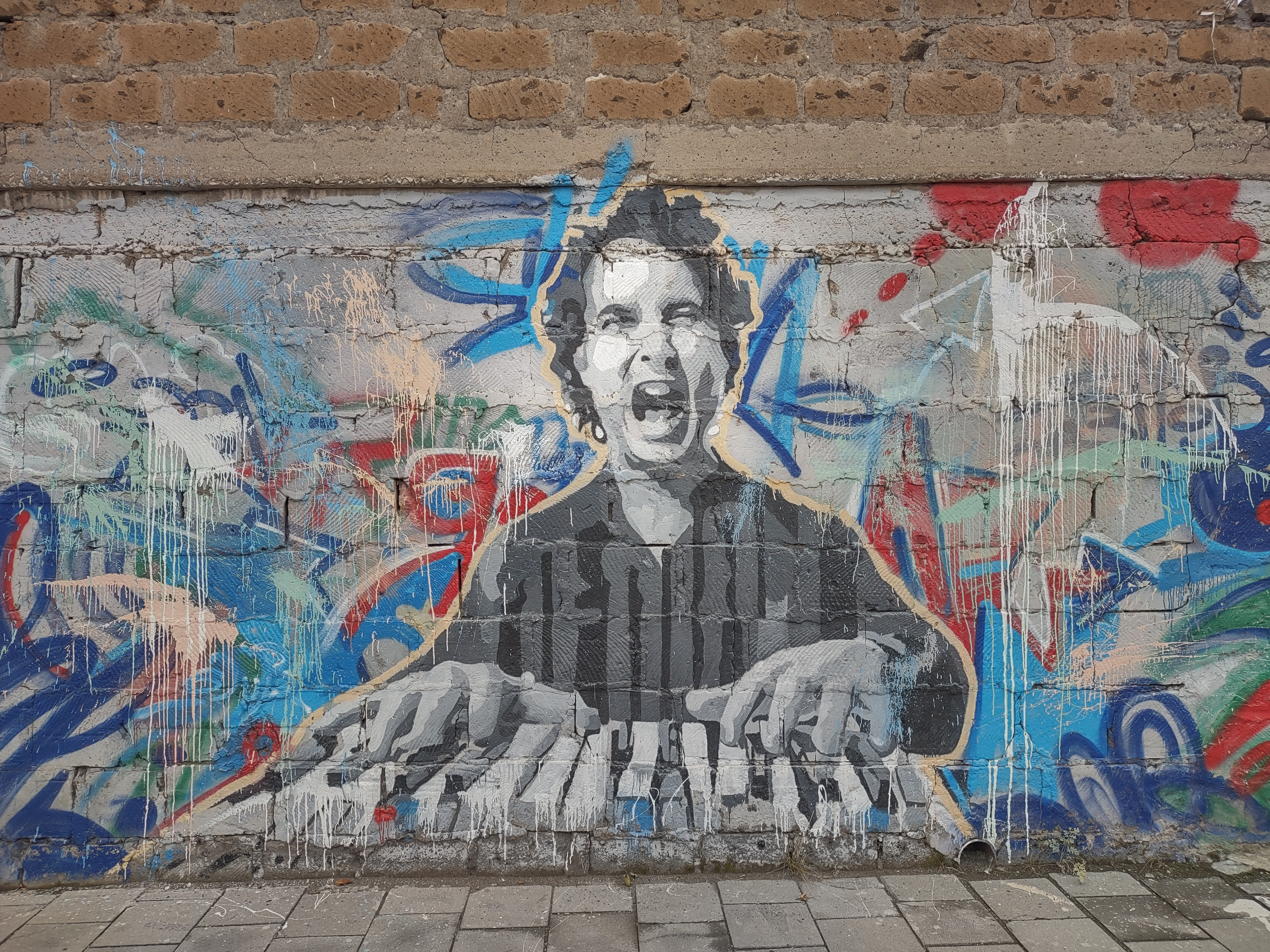
Mural of Tigran in Gyumri, Armenia

- 2002: 3rd Prize Concours International de Piano-Jazz Martial Solal (Paris)
- 2003: 1st Prize Jazz à Juan Révélations in the jazz instrumental category
- 2003: 1st Prize Prix de la Critique et du Public, Concours de Piano du Montreux Jazz Festival
- 2005: 3rd Prize Concours de Piano-Jazz de Moscou
- 2005: 1st Prize 8ème Concours de Solistes de Jazz de Monaco
- 2006: 1st Prize Thelonious Monk Institute of Jazz International Competition
- 2006: 2nd Prize Concours International de Piano-Jazz Martial Solal
- 2013: Vilcek Prize for Creative Promise in Contemporary Music
- 2015: Paul Acket Award in the North Sea Jazz Festival
- 2016: ECHO Jazz Awards

== Discography ==
=== As leader ===
Year	Album	Record label	Peak positions		
Year	Album	Record label	BEL (Wa)	FR	Jazz Albums
2006	World Passion	Nocturne	–	–	–
2007	New Era	Plus Loin	–	–	–
2009	Aratta Rebirth: Red Hail	Plus Loin	–	–	–
2011	A Fable	Verve	–	70	–
2013	Shadow Theater	Verve	127	63	–
2015	Mockroot	Nonesuch	–	–	11
2015	Luys i Luso	ECM	–	–	–
2017	An Ancient Observer	Nonesuch	–	191	12
2019	They Say Nothing Stays the Same (Original Motion Picture Soundtrack)	SEEBEDON	–	–	–
2020	The Call Within	Nonesuch	–	–	–
2022	StandArt	Nonesuch	–	–	–
2024	The Bird of a Thousand Voices	Naïve	–	–	–
2026	Manifeste	Naïve	–	–	–

EPs

- EP No. 1 (2011) – released exclusively on vinyl and digital download
- The Poet (2014)
- For Gyumri (Nonesuch, 2018)

=== As sideman ===
- 2010: Abu Nawas Rhapsody – with Dhafer Youssef (Jazzland)
- 2011: Lines of Oppression – with Ari Hoenig (Naïve/AH-HA)
- 2012: Liberetto – with Lars Danielsson (ACT)
- 2012: Lobi – with Stéphane Galland (Out There/Out Note)
- 2013: Jazz-Iz-Christ – with Serj Tankian, Valeri Tolstov, and Tom Duprey
- 2013: The World Begins Today – with Olivier Bogé, Sam Minaie, and Jeff Ballard (Naïve)
- 2014: Liberetto II – with Lars Danielsson (The Act Company)
- 2015: Ancient Mechanisms – with LV (Brownswood)
- 2016: Atmosphères – with Arve Henriksen, Eivind Aarset, and Jan Bang (ECM)
