= LV (musical duo) =

Electronic music duo

- Origin: London, United Kingdom
- Years active: 2007; 18 years ago–present
- Labels: Hyperdub
- Members: Si Williams and Will Horrocks

LV is an electronic music duo of Si Williams and Will Horrocks, created in 2007, who met when they were both studying at University College London. The duo is based in London and has produced four albums to date. The duo have collaborated with artists on all of their albums and collaborations have included working with Tigran Hamasyan and Okmalumkoolkat.

Their first single was Globetrotting, which featured the vocals of Errol Bellot. Northern Line was released as a single from their first album Routes and features Joshua Idehen, a spoken word artist. The single Boomslang (released in 2010) has been described by critics as their "breakout album" and was produced in collaboration with Okmalumkoolkat.

Routes was the first album released by LV and features vocal samples by Joshua Idehen Sebenza was their second album and is in collaboration with South African rappers Okmalumkoolkat and Spoek Mathambo, the South African duo Ruffest, and Dirty Paraffin. Islands is their third album and also featured vocal samples from Joshua Idehen. Ancient Mechanisms is their latest album, which features Tigran Hamasyan on the piano.

== Discography ==
=== Albums ===
Year	Album	Record label	Featuring
2011	Routes	Keysound Recordings	Joshua Idehen
2012	Sebenza	Hyperdub	Okmalumkoolkat, Ruffest and Spoek Mathambo
2014	Islands	Keysound Recordings	Joshua Idehen
2015	Ancient Mechanisms	Brownswood Recordings	Tigran Hamasyan

=== Singles ===
Year	Single	Record label
	Globetrotting	Keysound Recordings
2010	Northern Line - from Routes	Keysound Recordings
2010	Boomslang	
