= Saghmosavank =

Monastery in Armenia

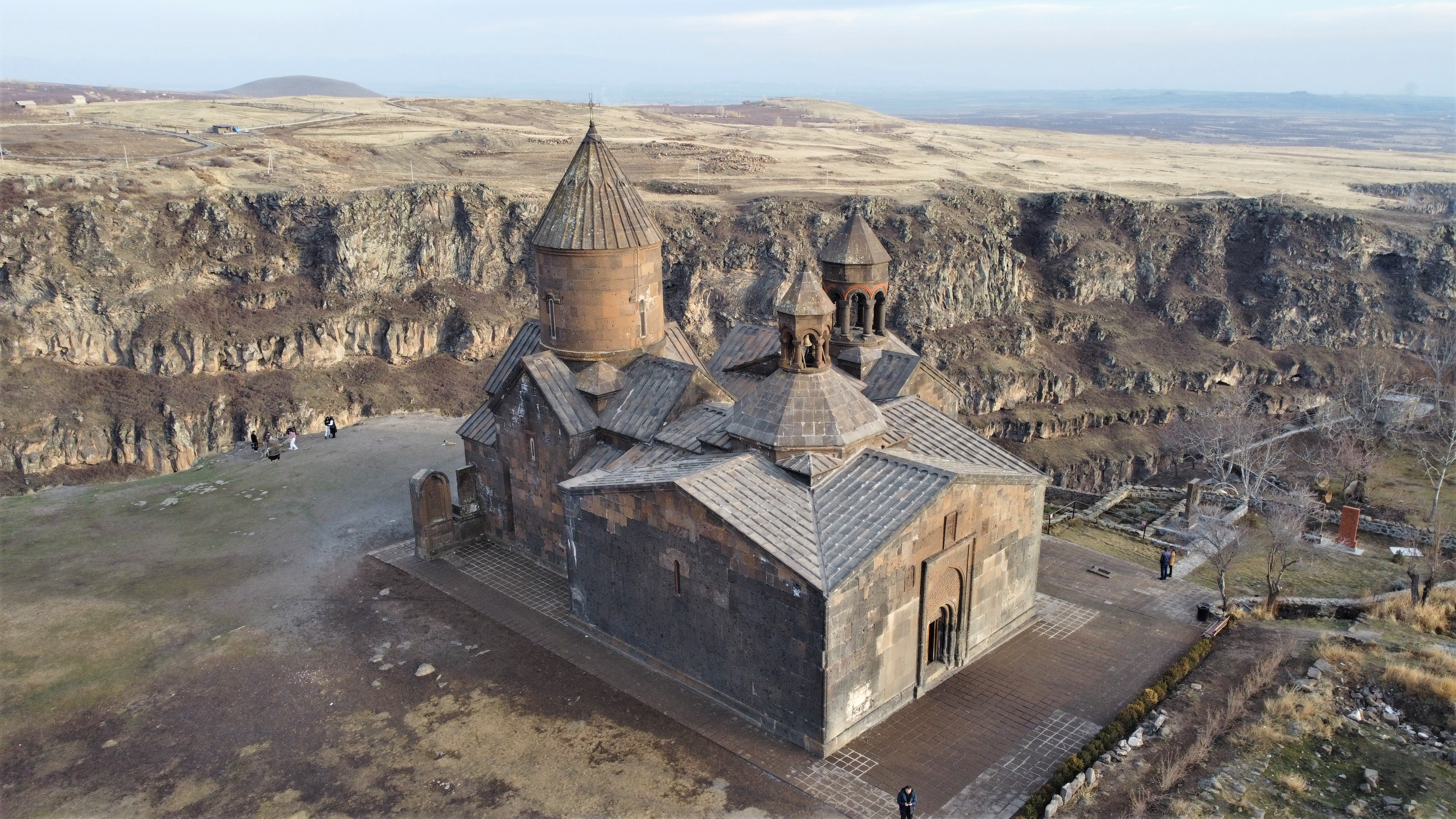
- An aerial view of the monastery

- Location within Armenia Location within Aragatsotn

Religion
- Affiliation: Armenian Apostolic Church

Location
- Location: Saghmosavan, Aragatsotn Province, Armenia
- Coordinates: 40.380536°N 44.396672°E

Architecture
- Architect: Vardapet Aighbairik
- Style: Armenian
- Groundbreaking: 1215
- Completed: 1221

The Saghmosavank (Armenian: Սաղմոսավանք, lit. "monastery of the Psalms") is a 13th-century Armenian monastic complex located in the village of Saghmosavan in the Aragatsotn Province of Armenia. Like the Hovhannavank monastery which is five kilometers south, Saghmosavank is situated atop the precipitous gorge carved by the Kasagh river. Their silhouettes dominate the adjacent villages and rise sharp against the background of the mountains crowned by Mount Aragats.

The monastic structures erected by Prince Vache Vachutyan, the Church of Zion in Saghmosavank (1215) and the Church of Karapet in Hovhannavank (1216–1221), belong to the same type of cross-winged domed structure with two-floor annexes in all the corners of the building. Subcupola space predominates in the interiors of both churches, which is reflected in the exterior shapes of these structures.

The zhamatun attached to the church was erected by his son Kurt in 1255.

== Gallery ==
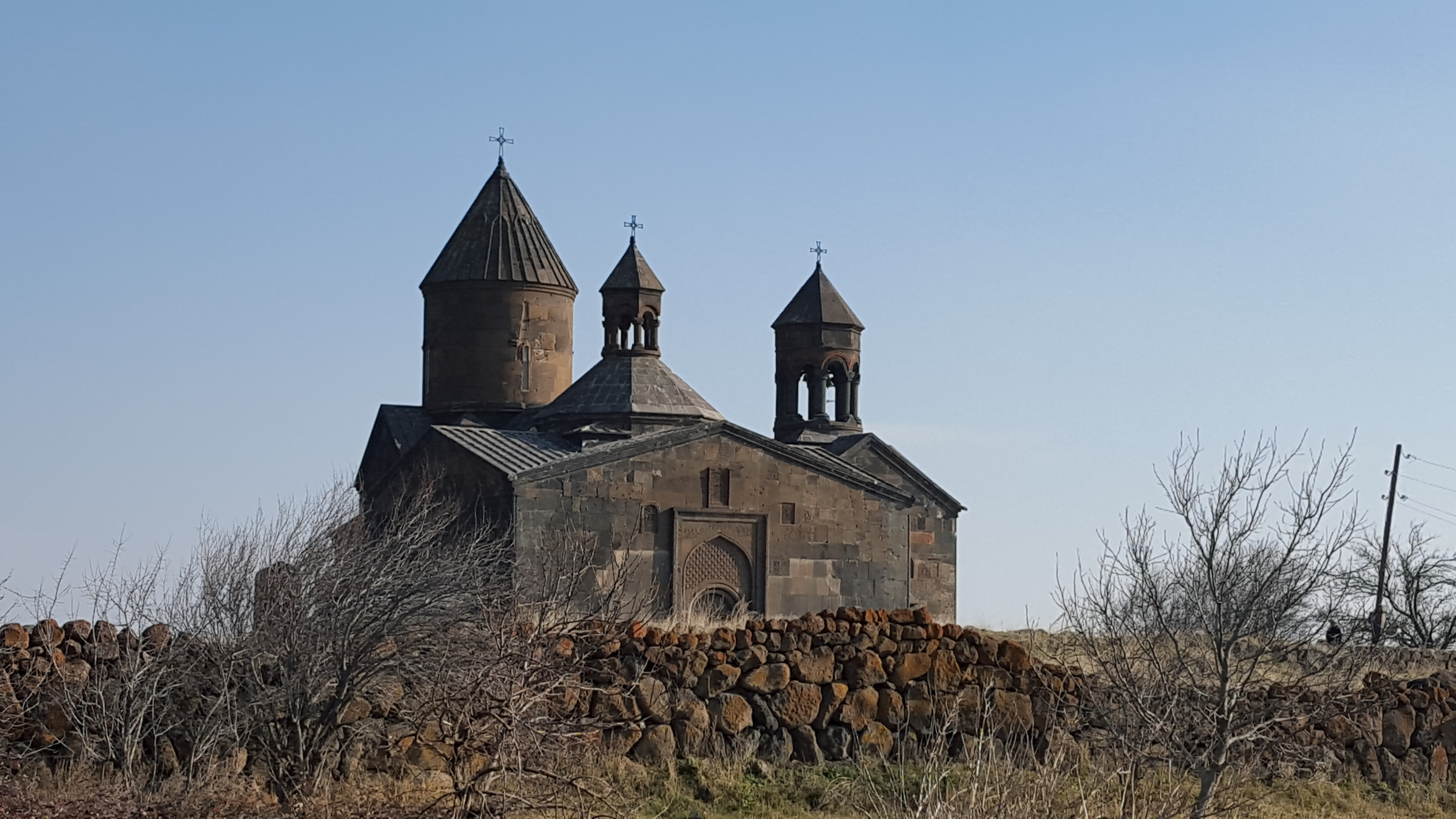

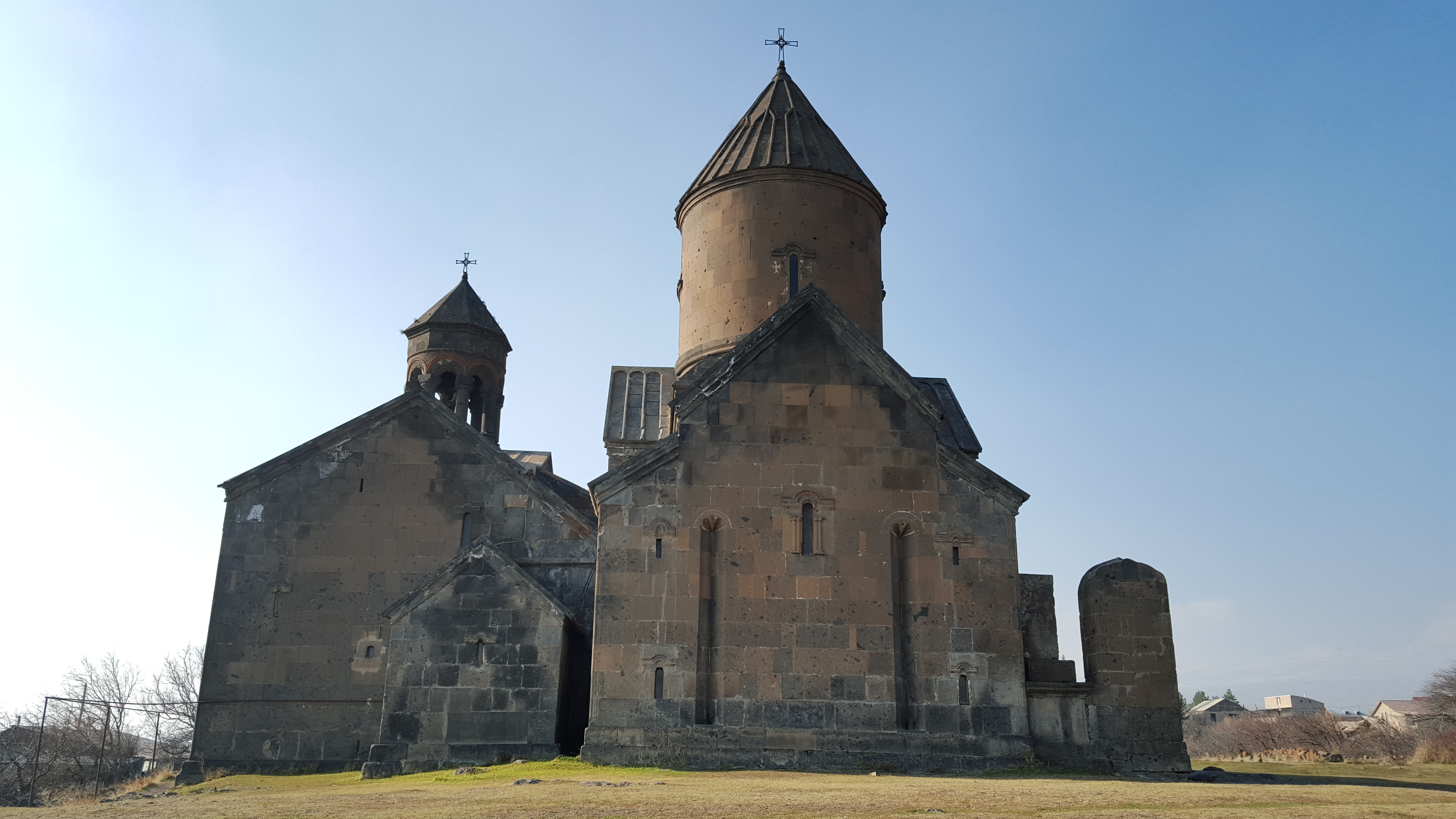

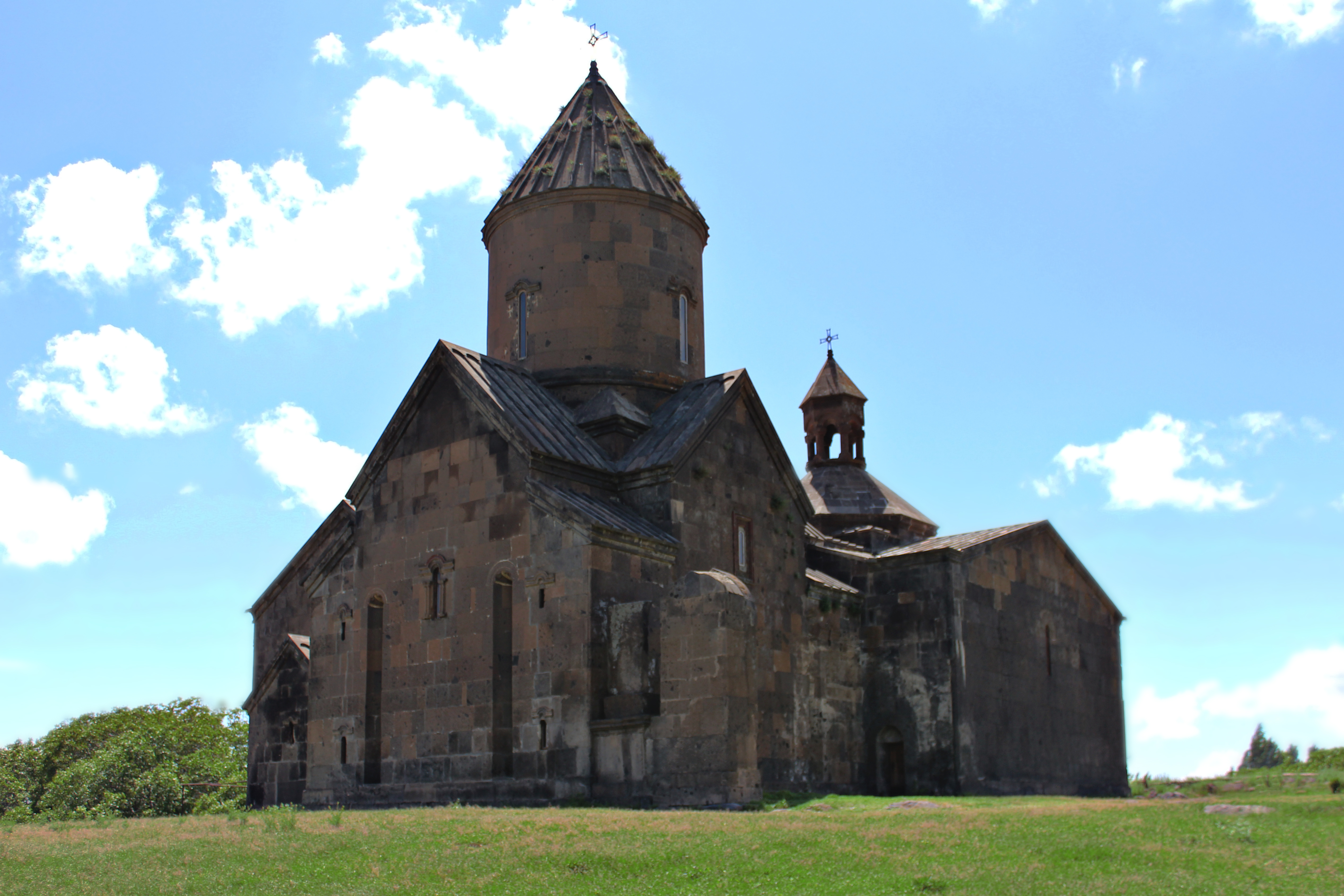

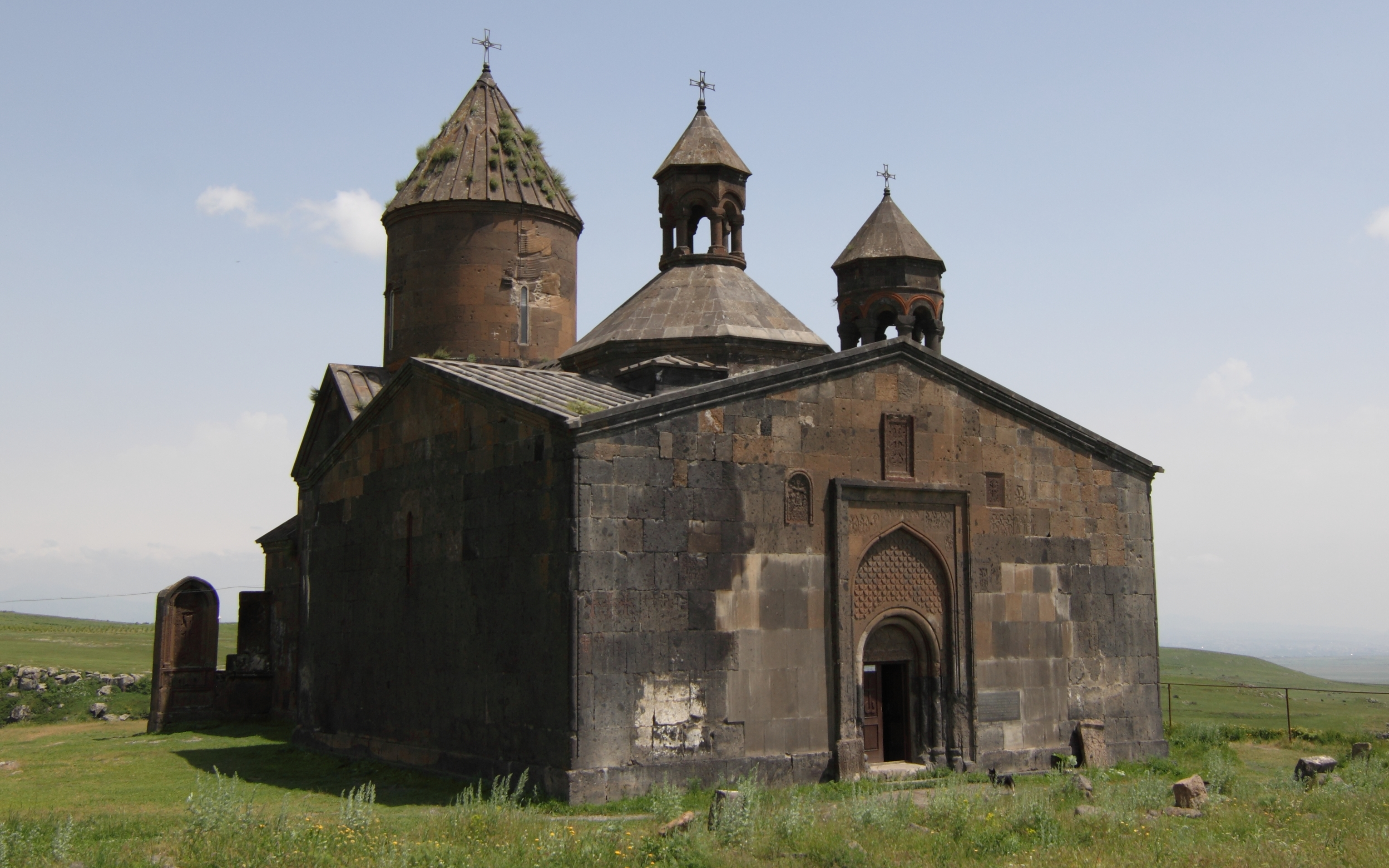

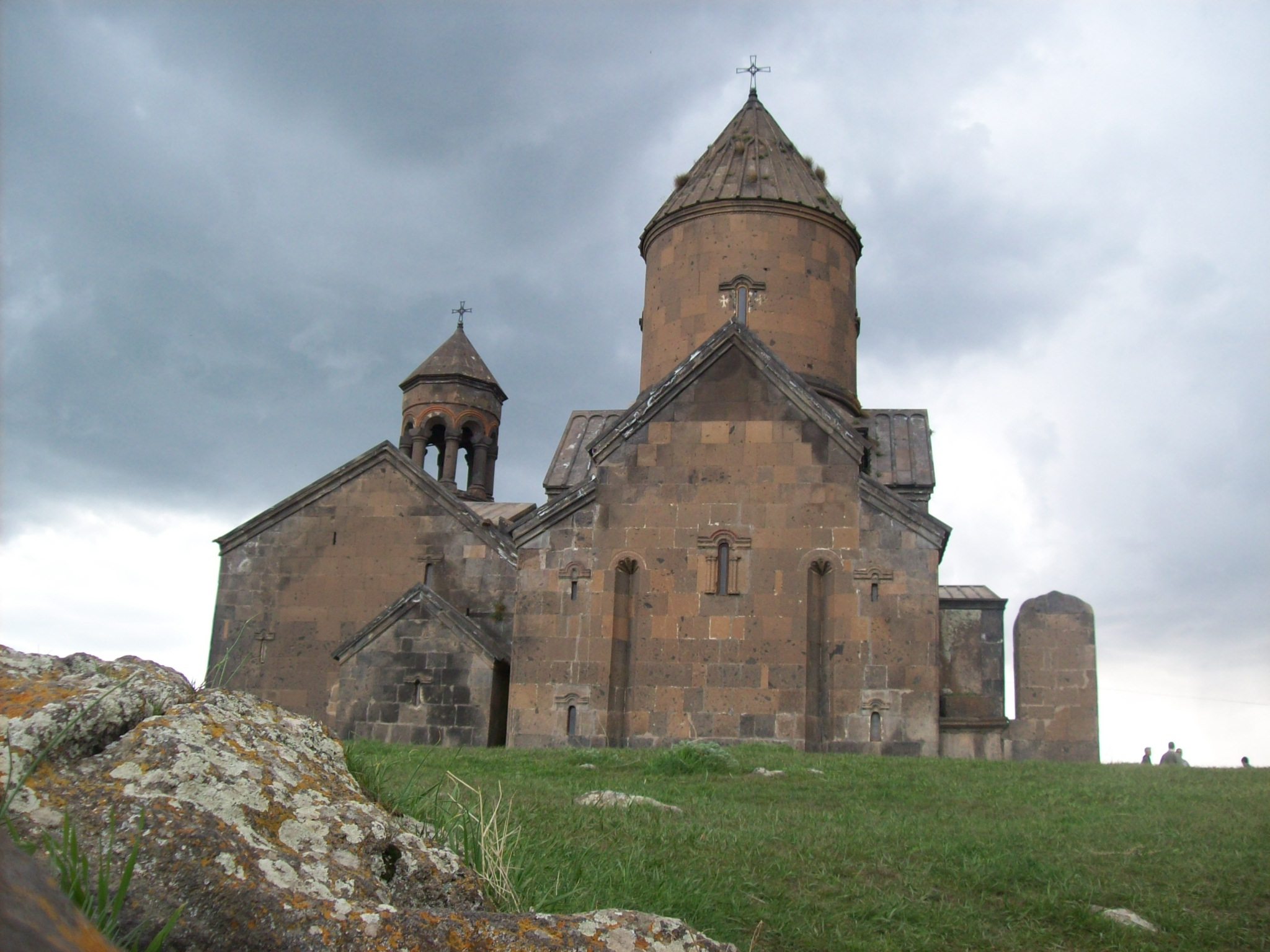

=== Zhamatun ===
The zhamatun was erected by Kurt Vachutyan in 1255.

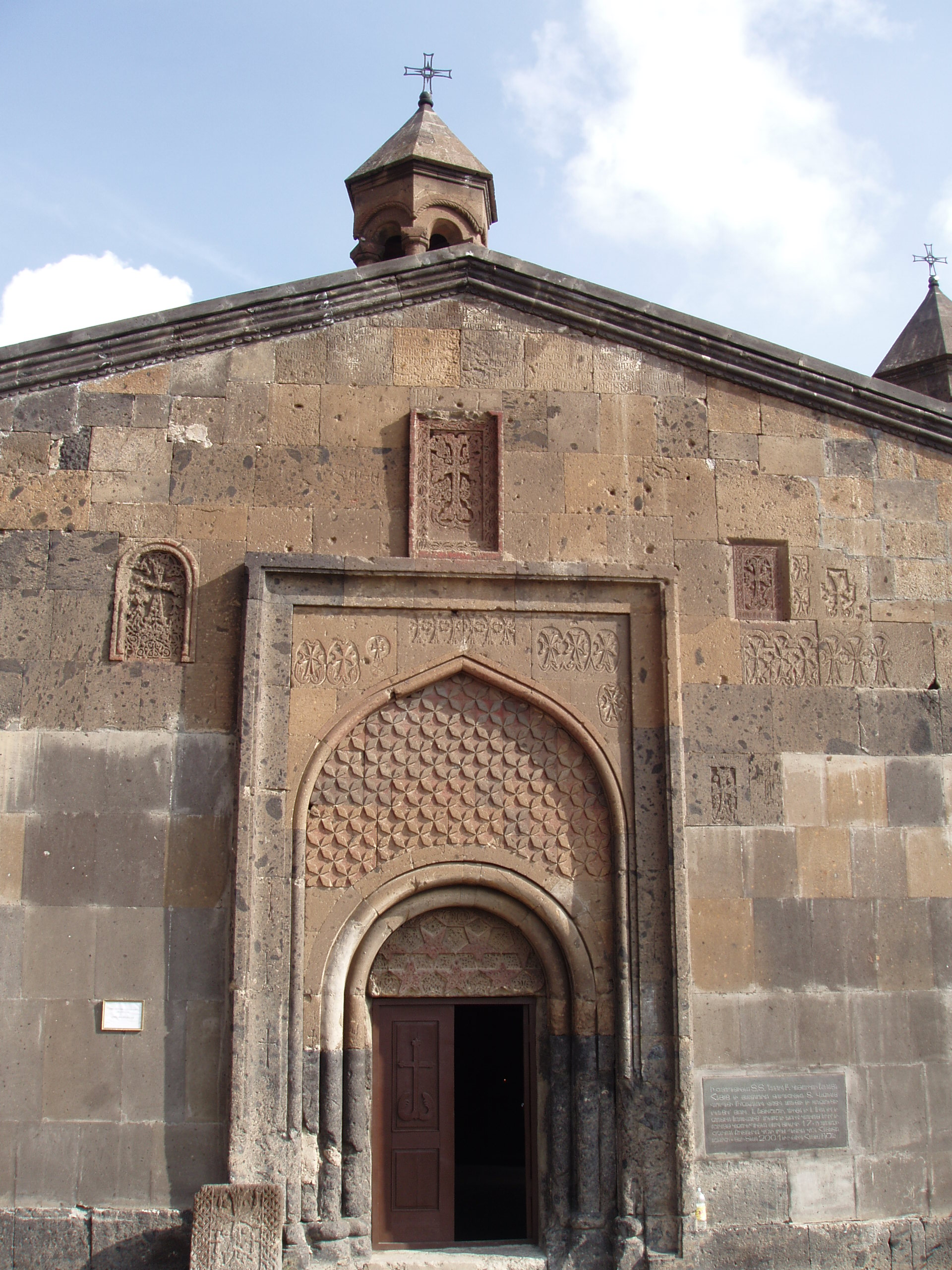

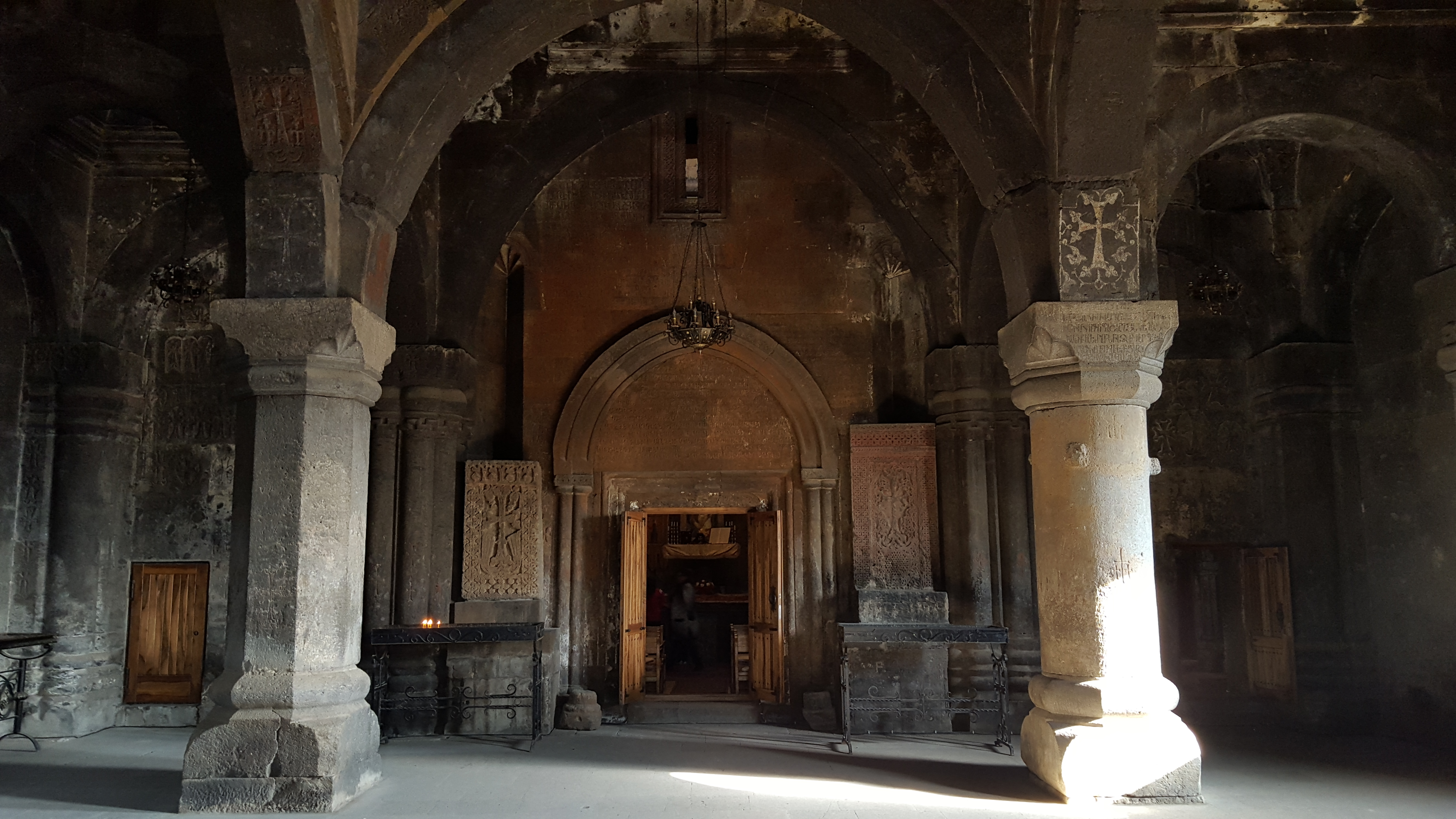

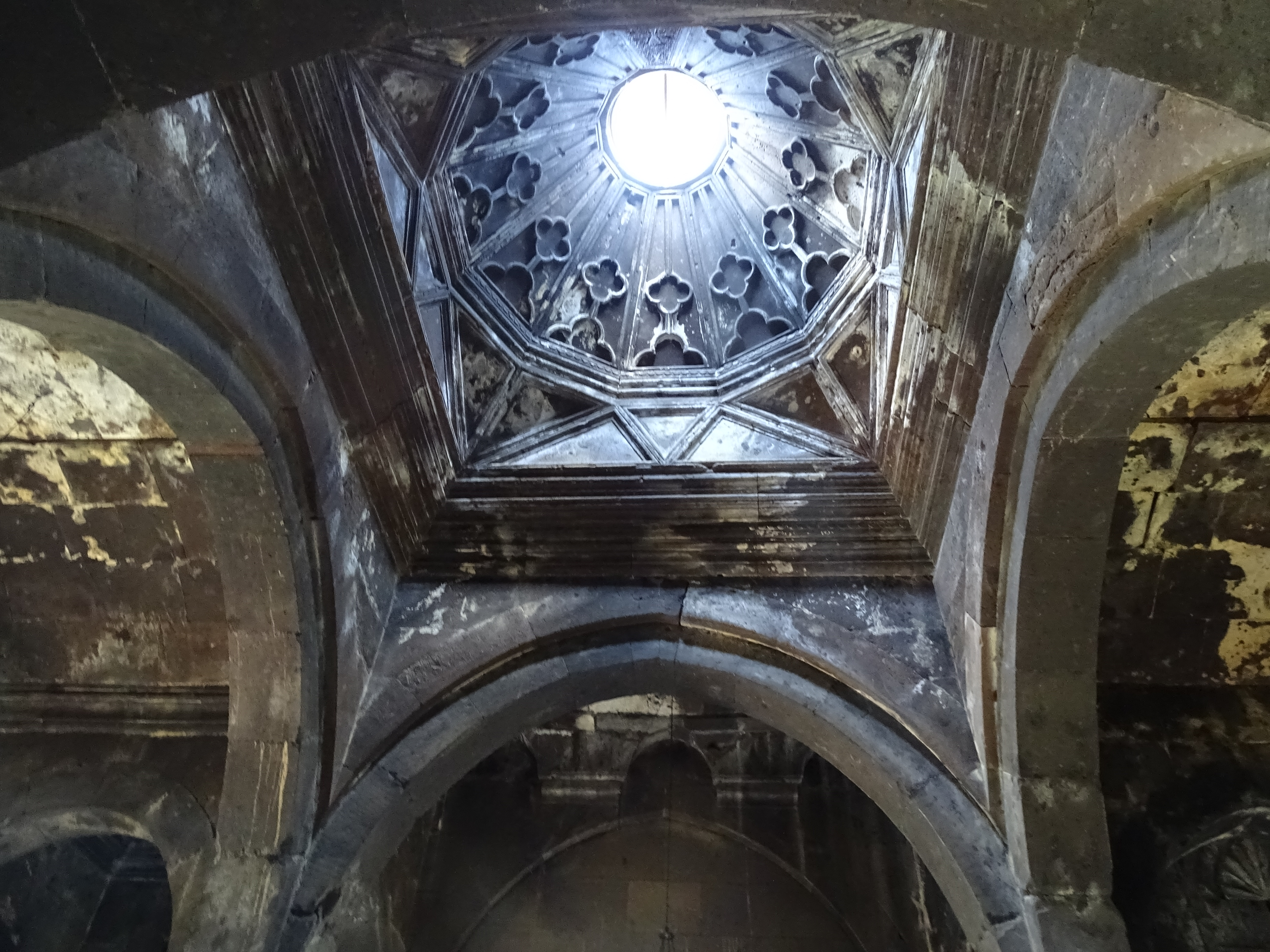

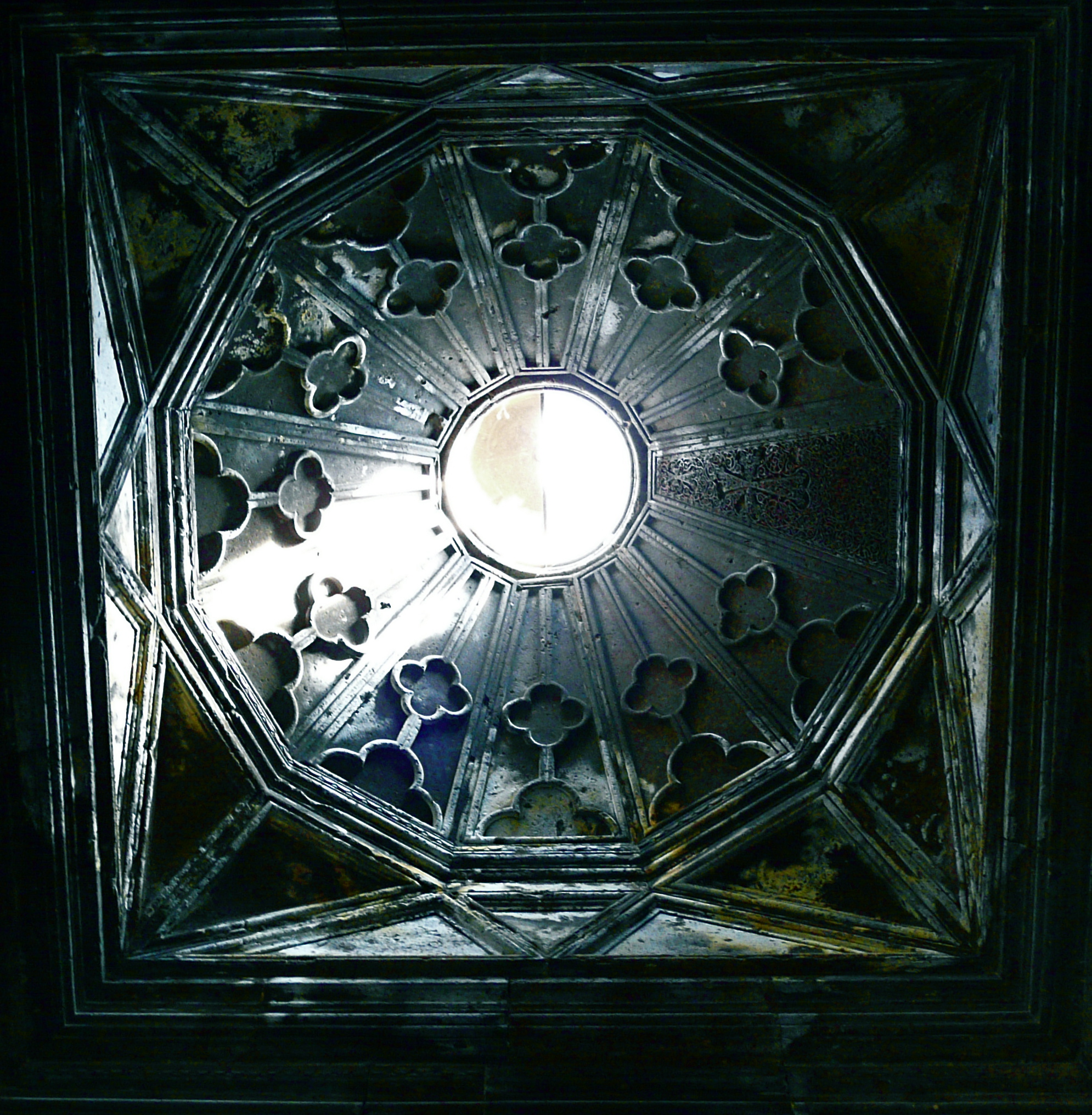

== See also ==
- Hovhannavank
