= Fable (singer) =

- Born: Holly Cosgrove; 19 May 1995 (age 31); Paignton, Devon, England
- Instrument: Vocals
- Years active: 2014–present
- Labels: Viper Recordings, PLATOON, Redshift One, Naim Records
- Website: whoisfable.com

Holly Cosgrove (born 19 May 1995), known as Fable is an English musician and singer best known for her work with Archive and Paul Hartnoll. Her work has been variously compared in the British press to the likes of Thom Yorke. and Nine Inch Nails. Fable has recently toured with both Archive and British rock band, The Cult. She also performed on the Shangri-La Hell stage at the 2016 Glastonbury Festival

Fable currently resides in Brighton, UK.

== Recent projects ==
=== Parasite EP and work with Archive ===
In 2014 Fable released her debut EP, Parasite, co-written and produced by Archive to much critical acclaim. Lead track, 'Stranger In My Head' received over 150,000 plays on SoundCloud without formal support, and was featured in Q Magazine, The Guardian and quoted as "sizzling...one of my favourite tracks of 2014" by influential music blog KickKickSnare. The next release from the EP, 'Silence Myself' was premiered in Clash Magazine, who called the track a "dark, glistening synth-pop gem" and was also named Track Of The Day in God Is In The TV. The track heightened Fable's reach in the United States as well, with The Vinyl District picking her up as Artist Of The Week, saying "we predict big things".

=== Paul Hartnoll and 8:58 ===
Following this, Fable proceeded to co-write and perform the track Cemetery on Paul Hartnoll's first post-Orbital project 8:58 alongside musicians including The Cure's Robert Smith and Cillian Murphy. She performed the song live with Hartnoll at the Isle of Wight Festival, Secret Garden Party, Beatherder Festival and Standon Calling later that year.

In March 2016, Fable released her latest single, Human Pretending, another co-write with Hartnoll, but under her own name, which was originally conceived as a subversive entry to the 2016 Eurovision Song Contest The track was premiered again in Clash Magazine where Fable was described as a "prodigal talent".

Having been invited to tour with The Cult in early 2016, Fable was also the subject of an interview in the Russian edition of Rolling Stone Magazine Fable has also worked with prominent DJ band, Freemasons on the 2015 single 'Persuasion', featured on popular pop music blog Popjustice.

=== Hiatus and return with Naim Records ===
Following on from her initial success, Fable suddenly disappeared from view as she took time to recover herself mentally, following the suicide of an ex-partner and close friend

She returned in October 2020, announcing a new single, Thirsty, and a debut album, titled Shame, which was released on July 29, 2022, on Naim Records, the label offshoot of the award-winning hi-fi manufacturer Naim Audio.

Fable is also an ambassador for the mental health charity My Black Dog
