= They Say Nothing Stays the Same =

2019 film by Joe Odagiri

- Directed by: Joe Odagiri
- Written by: Joe Odagiri
- Produced by: Shozo Ichiyama; Takuro Nagai; Yuusaku Nakajima
- Starring: Akira Emoto; Ririka Kawashima; Nijiro Murakami
- Cinematography: Christopher Doyle
- Edited by: Joe Odagiri; Masaya Okazaki
- Music by: Tigran Hamasyan
- Distributed by: Kino Films
- Release date: 13 September 2019 (Japan)
- Running time: 137 minutes
- Country: Japan
- Language: Japanese

They Say Nothing Stays the Same (Japanese: ある船頭の話, Hepburn: Aru Sendō no Hanashi) is a 2019 Japanese drama film directed by Joe Odagiri and stars Akira Emoto. In the debut directorial feature by actor Joe Odagiri, the film follows an old ferryman in a remote Meiji era community. For years, he has transported people back and forth on a river amid unspoiled beauty. His placid and cyclical life is disturbed by the construction of the nearby bridge, and transformed by saving a girl floating in the water. Shot by Christopher Doyle and the debut film music feature by Tigran Hamasyan.

== Plot ==
The ferryman Toichi sees a ghost on the side of the river. One evening, a girl wrapped in cloth flows in. He brings her into his hut and cares for her. Toichi hears rumors that in a village upstream, a family has been decapitated and killed, and a girl has been taken away. The girl turns out to be alive but spends all the day staring at the surface of the river, not saying a word. When Nihei, a hunter, sees her, Toichi lies and says that she is the daughter of a relative who has been taken care of for a while. The ghost of the river reappears and says, “I know you well.” One night, the girl by the river is gone.

Many people in the community talk about Toichi losing his job when a new bridge is completed. Genzo, a young neighbor, says. ” Why don't we destroy that bridge before it's finished?” Toichi has a daydream that he and Genzo kill people crossing the bridge while the river ghost watches.

One night, the girl at the river comes back. Toichi asks her if she has anywhere to go, and she shakes her head. On a day when there are no passengers, he takes the girl on his boat. The girl doesn't talk about herself, only telling him her name is “Foo”. The girl jumps into the river, and when Toichi jumps in after her, she is swimming around with a smile on her face. Toichi is relieved when Genzo goes to the village upstream and hears there was no murder.

On a night when it is raining heavily, Nihei's father dies. His dying wish is to dedicate his body to the forest, so Toichi takes a boat in the middle of the night to carry it there. Toichi tells the girl that he wants to become a person who can help others like Nihei's father.

Smoke rises from the bridge, which is nearing completion. When Toichi rushes to the bridge, the ghost of the river appears and says, "That girl should have died that night. I took her life, and she was supposed to leave her body and wait for her next life. But she was saved by you. The girl will torment you."

The bridge is completed and winter has arrived. The riversides are covered with snow and oil is floating in the river. Toichi is completely in low spirits. Genzo, now better dressed, visits the hut with an arrogant attitude. He confirms that Toichi is away at the doctor's office, and brings the girl into the hut. When Toichi crosses the bridge and returns to the hut, he finds Genzo killed by slitting his throat. Toichi sets fire to the hut and launches his boat with the girl. The boat with the two on board goes down the river.

== Cast ==
- Akira Emoto as Toichi
- Ririka Kawashima as girl
- Nijiro Murakami as Genzo
- Tsuyoshi Ihara as bridge laborer
- Tadanobu Asano as regular passenger
- Jun Murakami as merchant
- Yū Aoi as geisha
- Takashi Sasano as passenger with a bull
- Mitsuko Kusabue as woman telling "fox story"
- Haruomi Hosono as Nihei's father
- Masatoshi Nagase as Nihei
- Isao Hashizume as doctor
- Kukki! as chindon'ya"
- Jun-ichi Komoto as bridge laborer

== Reception ==
On review aggregator website Rotten Tomatoes, They Say Nothing Stays the Same has a 100% approval rating based on 15 reviews, with an average rating of 8.17/10. On Metacritic, based on 4 critics, the film has a 66/100 rating, signifying "Generally Favorable". Odagiri received the Golden Crow Pheasant for Best Film at the 2019 International Film Festival of Kerala for being "a poetic tale of idyllic rural life being threatened by change in a uncompromising visual style," and the Best Film, International Feature Film Competition Award of the 2019 Antalya Golden Orange Film Festival.
