= Aesop's Fables (disambiguation) =

Aesop's Fables are a collection of fables credited to Aesop, a slave and story-teller believed to have lived in ancient Greece between 620 and 560 BCE.

Aesop's Fables may also refer to:

- Aesop's Fables (film series), a series of animated short subjects
- Aesop's Fables (album), 1965 comedy album by the Smothers Brothers
- Aesop's Fables (Pinkney book), a 2000 children's picture book by Jerry Pinkney
- Aesop's Fables, a book by Enid Blyton in the Old Thatch series
