= Armenian folk music =

Music genre

Armenian folk music is a genre of Armenian music. It usually uses the duduk, the kemenche, and the oud. It is very similar to folk music in the Caucasus and shares many similar songs and traditions with countries around Armenia, namely Georgia and Azerbaijan.

== The Importance of Armenian Folk Music For The Armenian Nation And Musical Culture ==
The original Armenian folk music forms the basis of national self-awareness and defines the socio-cultural identity of the Armenian people, along with other attributable components of the socio-cultural life of the Armenian ethnicity.

Being one of the oldest, having vividly expressed originality, melodic richness and compositional nobility, Armenian folk music has had a significant impact on the development of musical culture worldwide.

== Origin Story ==
Armenian folk music dates back to ancient times. Its scientifically noticeable history has more than three millennia. This process already began in the 20th-18th centuries B.C.

In the territory of the Armenian highlands (geographical and cultural area, within the boundaries of which the ethnogenesis of the Armenian nation took place), many artifacts were found, which testify that the art of music flourished here in B.C. since at least the second millennium. Such artifacts are ancient musical instruments discovered by archaeologists, as well as various images of people playing music (including petroglyphs) and ancient written (mainly cuneiform) monuments that tell about certain events, ceremonies and actions that were accompanied by music.

The original features of Armenian folk music were formed in its bosom due to the constant cross-breeding of Balkan and Western Anatolian musical traditions with the musical traditions of such ancient cultures of the Middle East as Hittite, Aramaic, Assyro-Babylonian and Persian, as well as a result of its complete assimilation with the culture of the state Urartu, which was advanced for its time.

Among the main (vocal, instrumental, mixed) genres and types of ancient Armenian folk music, according to the nature of their applied functions (religious and social significance), one can distinguish ritual, calendar, work, wedding, military, epic, dance, party, lyrical- love, lullaby, household, game, funeral and other categories of songs.

A special place in Armenian folk music is occupied by peasant songs, which include arable horovels, as well as the songs of Skitalians (travelers) belonging to the "Antun" (homeless) genre.

== Development stages of Armenian folk music ==
Information about Armenian folk singers (rhapsodes), gusans, whose work, in turn, originates from the earlier musical tradition of novelists, folk singers who told stories of epic poems of ancient Armenia, reaches us from the depths of the centuries. In particular, ancient Armenian authors of the 5th century such as Agathanghegos, Pavstos Buzand, Movses Khorenatsi, Yeghishe and others report about Gusan songs.

At first, the servants in the temple of God Gisane were called gusans, and in the Hellenistic era, the participants of farcical and satirical representations. Gusans sang songs accompanied by playing musical instruments, especially at parties, weddings, and funerals. They also performed the songs of the wandering homeless (Gharibi), epic songs, mythical tales, etc.

== Uniqueness of Armenian folk music ==
Many Armenian historians, writers, philosophers and music theorists, since ancient times to one degree or another, have been engaged in researching the aesthetic characteristics of Armenian folk and spiritual music of artists such as Mesrop Mashtots, Sahak Partev, Hovhannes Mandakuni, Stepanos Syunetsi (senior), Komitas Aghtetsi, Barsegh Tchon, Sahak Dzoraporetsi, Stepanos Syunetsi, Davit Anhaght, Davit Kerakan, Hakob Sanahnetsi, Grigor Narekatsi, Khachatur Taronatsi, Nerses Shnhorali, Hovhannes Imstaser, Hovhannes Yerznakatsi, Arakel Syunetsi, Hakob Krimetsi, Grigor Narekatsi, Frick, Hovhannes Tlkurantsi, Mkrtich Naghash, Minas Tokhatetsi, Petros Kapantsi, Baghdasar Dpir, Arakel Syunetsi, Mateos Dvugayetsi, Grigor Khlatetsi, Arakel Baghisetsi, Avetik Pakhtasaryan, Zenne Poghos, Khachatur Erzrumtsi, Mkhitar Sebastasi, Grigor Dpir Gapaskalyan (of four musicological treatises author) and others.

Such famous Armenian composers and folklorists of the 19th-20th centuries as Makar Yekmalyan, Spiridon Melikyan, Grigor Syunin, Nikoghayos Tigranyan, Kristapor Kara-Murza collected a large collection of samples of Armenian folk and spiritual music. However, the greatest merit in the coordination, study and deep aesthetic meaning of Armenian musical folklore belongs to Komitas, the founder of the National School of Scientific Folklore, he managed to collect, process and prepare for publication more than 2000 folk songs.

As a result of the tireless collective and scientific activity of Komitas, the ethnographer who created a real anthology of Armenian folk song and revealed the patterns of peasant musical thinking and musical speech, the questions of the antiquity of traditions, genre differentiation, genealogy and the crystallization of the means of artistic expression of secular ethnographic singing, at once and in the most convincing way, entered into the main problematology of Armenian monodic music. The latter very simply presented two branches: People-peasant and spiritual.

From the beginning, Armenian folk music was monodic, but enriched with various elements of polyphony (stretched tones, use of some types of antiphonal singing, etc.).

Komitas discovered the tetrachord structure of the fundamental sounds of Armenian folk music and the typical ways of connecting tetrachord-cells in it.

H. Kushnarev continued Komitas' musicological research in the field of Armenian folk music, who defined the basic diatonic sound system of Armenian music as a combination of three pure series of quarts (Mixolydian, Aeolian and Locrian), clarified the methods of forming chromatic sounds of Armenian folk music and gave a detailed description of the relationship of the tones arising in that examination base.

In general, music theory in Armenia has always been inextricably linked with musical aesthetics, so since ancient times, the melodic richness of Armenian folk music was explained purely from a musicological point of view by the fact that it has an extensive system of diatonic scales (including (i.e., illiterate hypolades in the middle position of the tonic, with the presence of a side support on different degrees, using different alterations, etc.), as well as extremely rich, (often variable, asymmetric, synchronic) rhythmic, using all kinds of (including mixed) meters and measures [28].

All the historically evolved forms of Armenian folk music, from simple peasant songs, melodies of novelists, gusans and hirelings to hymns, poems and troupes, are based on the wide use of various tricks of tone-thematic development, distinguished by melodic simplicity, honest balance and external factuality, with restraint in the use of various musical expressive means and a great inner expression of its deep-compositional structure.

== Prominent representatives of Armenian folk music of the past ==
- Grigor Khlatetsi
- Nakhapet Quchak, author of the famous works “Harenner”
- Sayat-Nova
- Naghash Hovmatan
- Baghdasar dpir (he is an author of poems)
- Egas
- Gul Arutin
- Bager Khazaros's son and others

The wonderful examples of Armenian folk music were created by gusans and ashughs of the 19th-20th centuries [38] such as Havasi, Sheram, Jivani, Ashugh Hayat, Gusan Ashot, Gusan Shahen, Gusan Gevorg, Gusan Avag, Gusan Smbat, Gusan Yervand, Gusan Hovsep (Nikoghosyan), Chtiganos, Ghunkianos Karnetsi, Azbar Adam, Shirin (Hovhannes Karapetyan), Jamali (Mkrtich). Talyants), Bright (Varsham Tratatyan) and others.

== Armenian folk music today ==
The modern panorama of Armenian folk music is rich and diverse.

Duduk player Jivan Gasparyan gained world recognition, and Armenian duduk music was recognized by UNESCO as a masterpiece of oral and intangible cultural heritage of humanity in 2005.

Other famous duduk players include Margar Margaryan, Levon Madoyan, Saro Danielyan, Vache Hovsepyan, Gevorg Dabaghyan, Yeghishe Manukyan and others. Armenak Shahmuradyan, Vagharshak Sahakyan and others have gained recognition among author-gusans, as well as virtuoso musicians who play keman, shvi and other folk instruments.

The genres of urban folk song and instrumental music, which also have old traditions, are developing. Many urban songs that have become popular were created by the words of famous Armenian poets G. Alishani, A. Isahakyan, H. Tumanyan, R. Patkanyan, G. Aghayan, M. Peshiktashlyani and H. Hovhannisyan, S. Shahaziz and more.

Araksya Gulzadyan, Norayr Mnatsakanyan, Vagharshak Sahakyan, Ruben Matevosyan, Hayrik Muradyan, Raffi Hovhannisyan, Papin Poghosyan, Ofelia Hambardzumyan, Varduhi Khachatryan, Valya Samvelyan, Rima Saribekyan, Susanna Safaryan, Manik, Flora Martirosyan, Alina Avagyan, Satenik Grigoryan Sargsyan, Armen Davtyan, Sevak Amroyan, Narek Poghosyan, Alexander Poghosyan, Edgar Khachatryan and others.

In 1938, the state ensemble of Armenian folk song and dance was organized in Armenia, which was later named after its founder, Tatul Altunyan. The ensemble named after Altunyan performs with great success all over the world even today.

The department of folk music composition has been actively working for decades at the GA Art Institute of Armenia.

== The influence of Armenian folk music on Armenian spiritual and classical music ==
As evidenced by the studies of many major musicologists, Armenian spiritual music borrowed the accent of Armenian peasant songs [44].

The first psalms are noted for their laconic form and simplicity of content. Their melodies, unlike traditional psalms where the speaker rules, stand out for their vivid folk singing.

Komitas demonstrated with great conviction the direct connection of the three branches of Armenian national music (peasant, Gusan and spiritual).

Armenian Christian music, along with Aramaic and Greco-Cappadocian, lies at the core of a pan-Christian musical culture, presenting great interest for study as a musical culture in a country that adopted Christianity as the state religion before all other countries (at the beginning of the 4th century). Moreover, the researches of Armenian, Russian and foreign musicologists, first of all Komitas and Kristapor Kushnarian, provide a basis for considering the development of Armenian early Christian musical aesthetics as a completely independent and original phenomenon of culture, which has deeply assimilated the best traditions of Armenian folk music.

The rich traditions of Armenian folk music also had a great influence on the development of Armenian classical music, which allowed the outstanding Armenian composer Tigran Chukhajyan to become the author of an epoch-making work ( "Arshak II", 1868), which is the first national opera in the history of musical culture not only for Armenians, but also for all the other peoples of the East.

T. Chukhajian was also the author of the first national operettas. and symphonic works in the East, in which the achievements of the leading composer schools of Europe were organically synthesized with the best traditions of Armenian folk and spiritual music

The symphonic works of Armenian composers of the next generations were also noted with the bright color of Armenian folk music, such as the artists A. Spendiaryan, A. Ter-Ghevondyan, K. Zakaryan, A. Stepanyan, S. Balasanyan, A. Khachatryan, T. Ter-Martirosyan, G. Yeghiazaryan, L. Saryan, A. Harutyunyan, A. Babajanyan, e. Mirzoyan, e. Hovhannisyan, Khagvortyan, A. Terteryan and others.

== Armenian folk musical instruments ==
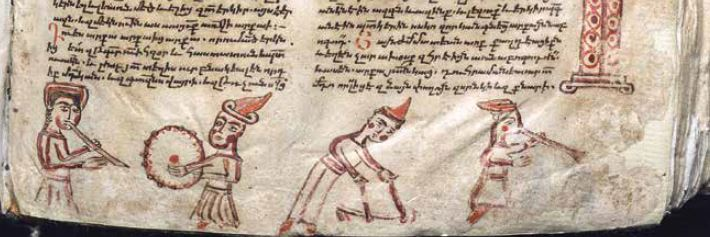
Quartet page from Armenian manuscript, 140-1401

- Armenian duduk is made exclusively from apricot wood, which has unique qualities and resonance characteristics.

In other countries, different variations of the duduk are made from other materials (plum wood, walnut wood, etc.), however, as experts claim, such a duduk is characterized by a rather sharp, nasal sound, while the Armenian duduk is distinguished by a soft sound, reminiscent of a live human voice.

Duduk's tongue is made from two pieces of reed, which grows in abundance on the banks of the Araks River. Unlike other two-toned instruments, the reed of the duduk is quite wide, which gives the instrument its unique sad sound. In the 1920s-30s, the Armenian duduk was improved by the master V. With the musical instruments of Buni, who, mainly preserving the initial structure of the folk instrument, created 3 types of duduk of different registers. The last of them, which has the lowest (baritone) voice register, is known by the name of its designer, Bunifon.

- Dhol is a percussion musical instrument, a type of double-sided drum that is cylindrical in shape and covered with one or two membranes. The emergence of dhol refers to the linguistic period of Armenian history. This instrument was used by Armenians during military campaigns, and it is also used in an ensemble with zurnas, for the musical accompaniment of various dances, solemn ceremonies, holiday processions, etc. Two sticks made of bamboo or cane can be used to play the dhol. Thick is called copal, and thin is called tchipot, but the technique of playing with fingers and palms of both hands is most common.
- Bambir, Kemani are Armenian stringed folk musical instruments. Bambir has 4 strings, tuned to quarta or quinta. Bambir is played sitting, holding the instrument between the knees. Two or three strings can be played simultaneously. Bambir's homeland is the northern part of historical Armenia, Javakheti, the Black Sea coast. The first information about Bambir comes from the 9th century. During the excavations of Dvin, one of the capitals of Armenia, a violin-like instrument with the image of a musician on his shoulder was found, a variant of which is the bambir.

The bowed instrument of the violin is a relative of the Pontic lyre. Keman differs from Bambir in size (55–70 cm long) and the number of main lines (four to seven). In addition to the main strings, as in the gadulka, the keman has four resonant or so-called sympathetic strings, which create a constant background sound when the instrument is played.

Keman was widespread in Cappadocia, as well as in the cities and villages of Ponta: Trabizon, Atapazar, Ordu, Giresun. The Armenian population of Ponta uses the violin more often than other types of bowed instruments. In Armenia, the famous Ashugh Jivani played the violin. In its latest versions (20th century), the violin already has several register changes.

== See also ==
- Gusan
- Hymn
- Khaz
- Ashugh
- Armenia
- Armenian culture
- Armenian historians
