= 1st Linlithgowshire Rifle Volunteers =

1st Linlithgowshire Rifle Volunteers 8th Volunteer Battalion, Royal Scots 10th (Cyclist) Battalion, Royal Scots 14th (West Lothian, Royal Scots) LAA Rgt, RA 514 (West Lothian, Royal Scots) LAA Rgt, RA
- Active: 19 March 1860–1967
- Country: United Kingdom
- Branch: Territorial Army
- Role: Infantry; Cyclist; Air Defence
- Part of: Royal Scots; Anti-Aircraft Command; Eighth Army
- Garrison/HQ: Linlithgow
- Engagements: Second Boer War; World War I: North Russia Intervention; World War II: Battle of Britain; Siege of Tobruk; North African Campaign; Operation Avalanche; Italian Campaign

The 1st Linlithgowshire Rifle Volunteers was a Scottish unit of Britain's Volunteer Force raised in Linlithgow in 1860. It later became a cyclist battalion of the Royal Scots, which served in Home Defence and saw action in the North Russia Intervention force during World War I. Between the wars it was reduced to company strength, but just before World War II it was converted into an anti-aircraft (AA) regiment of the Royal Artillery (RA). This served in Anti-Aircraft Command during the Blitz and later distinguished itself in the Siege of Tobruk. It fought through the Italian Campaign and its successors continued in the postwar Territorial Army (TA) until 1967.

== Volunteer Force ==
The enthusiasm for the Volunteer movement following an invasion scare in 1859 saw the creation of many Rifle Volunteer Corps (RVCs) composed of part-time soldiers eager to supplement the Regular British Army in time of need. One such unit was the 1st Linlithgowshire Rifle Volunteers, a company formed at Linlithgow, the county town of West Lothian (or Linlithgowshire), on 19 March 1860 under the command of Captain Robert Stewart. It was soon followed by companies formed in other towns of West Lothian, and they were combined as the 1st Administrative Battalion of Linlithgowshire Rifle Volunteers with Stewart promoted to major in command on 21 October 1862:

- 1st Linlithgowshire RVC, formed at Linlithgow 19 March 1860
- 2nd Linlithgowshire RVC, formed at Bo'ness 19 March 1860
- 3rd Linlithgowshire RVC, formed at Bathgate 25 April 1860, moving to Torphichen in 1864
- 4th Linlithgowshire RVC, formed at Bathgate 9 August 1862 from employees of Young's Chemical Works under the command of James Young
- 5th Linlithgowshire RVC, formed at Uphall 28 January 1870
- 6th Linlithgowshire RVC, formed at West Calder as one company and a subdivision 17 April 1878

When the RVCs were consolidated in 1880 the 1st Admin Bn became the 1st Linlithgowshire Rifle Volunteers on 16 March and the individual RVCs became lettered companies, the subdivision of the 6th becoming F Company at Addiewell, the rest of the 6th becoming G Company at West Calder. C Company moved to Armadale the following year.

=== Localisation ===
Under the 'Localisation of Forces' scheme introduced in 1872 by the Cardwell Reforms, the 1st Linlithgowshire was grouped with the 1st Regiment of Foot (the Royal Scots), the Edinburgh Light Infantry Militia and a number of RVCs from neighbouring counties into Brigade No 62, which was a purely administrative formation. Under the Childers Reforms of 1881, the 1st Linlithgowshire became a Volunteer Battalion of the Royal Scots on 1 July, and was formally redesignated as the 8th Volunteer Battalion, Royal Scots in April 1888.

The Stanhope Memorandum of December 1888 introduced a Mobilisation Scheme for Volunteer units, which would assemble in their own brigades at key points in case of war. In peacetime these brigades provided a structure for collective training. Under this scheme the 8th VB was included in the Forth Brigade. In 1902 the Forth Brigade was split into the 1st and 2nd Lothian Brigades, with the 8th VB in the 2nd Brigade.

=== 2nd Boer War ===
Thirty-six volunteers from the battalion served in the Second Boer War, principally with the 1st and 2nd Volunteer Service Companies of the Royal Scots, earning the battalion its first Battle honour: South Africa 1900–02.

In 1900 the battalion raised three additional companies: H at South Queensferry, I at Kirkliston, and a Cyclist Company, while F Company moved to Fauldhouse. H Company was disbanded in 1906 and I Company was redesignated H.

== Territorial Force ==
When the Volunteers were subsumed into the new Territorial Force (TF) under the Haldane Reforms of 1908, the battalion was reorganised to form the 10th (Cyclist) Battalion, Royal Scots of 8 companies with headquarters at Linlithgow. Cyclist battalions did not form part of the TF's divisions but were 'Army Troops' held at Command level; 10th (Cyclist) Bn Royal Scots was under Scottish Command.

== World War I ==
=== Mobilisation ===
On the outbreak of war on 4 August 1914, the battalion mobilised and was assigned to coastal defence at Berwick-upon-Tweed. Almost immediately, TF units were invited to volunteer for Overseas Service. On 31 August, the War Office authorised the formation of a reserve or 2nd Line unit for each TF unit where 60 per cent or more of the men had volunteered for Overseas Service. The titles of these 2nd Line units would be the same as the original, but distinguished by a '2/' prefix. They were filled with the volunteers who were coming forward in large numbers – 2/10th Royal Scots was recruited in under a week in September – and 3rd Line training units were formed in 1915.

=== Coast Defence ===
From 7 November 1914 the cyclist battalions formed part of the newly formed Army Cyclist Corps. The 1/10th (Cyclist) Bn Royal Scots was joined at Berwick by the 2/10th in January 1915, and both battalions remained there until April and June 1918, when they were transferred to Ireland. The battalion was finally disembodied at The Curragh on 26 February 1920. A 3/10th Bn was formed in 1915 and then disbanded in March 1916, when its personnel were distributed to the 1/10th, 2/10th and the newly formed Machine Gun Corps.

=== North Russia ===
By 1918, 2/10th Bn had sent many drafts overseas and was now composed mainly of men of B1 medical category. However, the War Office needed troops for a North Russia Intervention force, and after reorganising as an infantry battalion and being brought up to strength with drafts from other units in Ireland, the 2/10th returned to England in July 1918. It was then shipped to Arkhangelsk as part of the force, arriving in late August 1918.

Leaving one company in Arkhangelsk, the battalion operated along a 50 miles (80 km) stretch of the Northern Dvina River, south of its junction with the Vaga River. Movement and observation were hampered by marshes and forests, but supported by the Royal Navy monitor HMS M33 the Royal Scots cleared the triangle between the Dvina and Vaga and took a number of villages and prisoners. The strongly fortified village of Pless could not be attacked frontally, so A Company, less one platoon, attempted a flanking movement through the marshes. The following morning the company reached Kargonin, behind Pless, and the defenders – thinking themselves cut off by a large force – evacuated both villages. The regimental historian describes this as 'a quite remarkable march by predominantly B1 troops'.

By late September, with a body of US Army troops, the battalion had reached Nijne-Toimski, which proved too strong for the lightly equipped Allied force, who established a defensive line. The monitor then had to withdraw before the Dvina froze, and the force was shelled by Bolsehvik gunboats. It withdrew to a second defensive line for the winter. With the help of a Canadian Field Artillery battery it drove off a number of attacks, culminating in a very heavy assault on 11 November. 2/10th Royal Scots was then reinforced by the company from Archangelsk, which had been engaged at Obozerskaya on the Vologda railway line. The force then settled into billets in villages and log blockhouses, while training and raids were carried out on snowshoes, skis and sledges.

The Bolsheviks resumed the offensive early in 1919, and A Company had to be sent to reinforce a heavily pressed force on the Vaga, marching with sledges over 50 miles (80 km) in temperatures 40–60 degrees below freezing. The Bolsheviks now had artillery superiority, there was no anti-Bolshevik rising among the local population, the White Russian troops mutinied in April, and the US troops were withdrawn in May. Nevertheless, the force remained in position; 2/10th Royal Scots was relieved by other British troops. The battalion returned by barge to Archangelsk and sailed for home on 10 June. It arrived at Leith where it was immediately demobilised on 25 June.

== Interwar ==
When the TF was reformed as the Territorial Army (TA) in 1920, the 10th (Cyclist) Bn first formed the 1st (Linlithgow) Light Bridging Company of the Royal Engineers, then in 1921 it became A Company of the 4/5th (Queen's Edinburgh Rifles) Bn, Royal Scots at Edinburgh, with Company HQ remaining at Linlithgow. The 4/5th Bn formed part of 155th (East Scottish) Bde of 52nd (Lowland) Division.

=== 14th (West Lothian, Royal Scots) LAA Rgt ===
During the 1930s the increasing need for anti-aircraft (AA) defence for Britain's cities was addressed by converting a number of TA infantry battalions into AA units. The 4th/5th Royal Scots was one of the battalions selected, becoming a searchlight (S/L) regiment in 1938. At the same time, the TA was doubled in size following the Munich Crisis, so two regiments were formed, with A Company providing the basis for a new 14th (West Lothian, Royal Scots) Light Anti-Aircraft Regiment of the Royal Artillery (RA). The Linlithgow company formed Regimental HQ (RHQ), 39 (Linlithgow) and 40 (Bathgate) LAA Batteries; 57 LAA Battery was raised at South Queensferry on 17 January 1939 and 58 LAA Bty at Edinburgh on 15 May 1939.

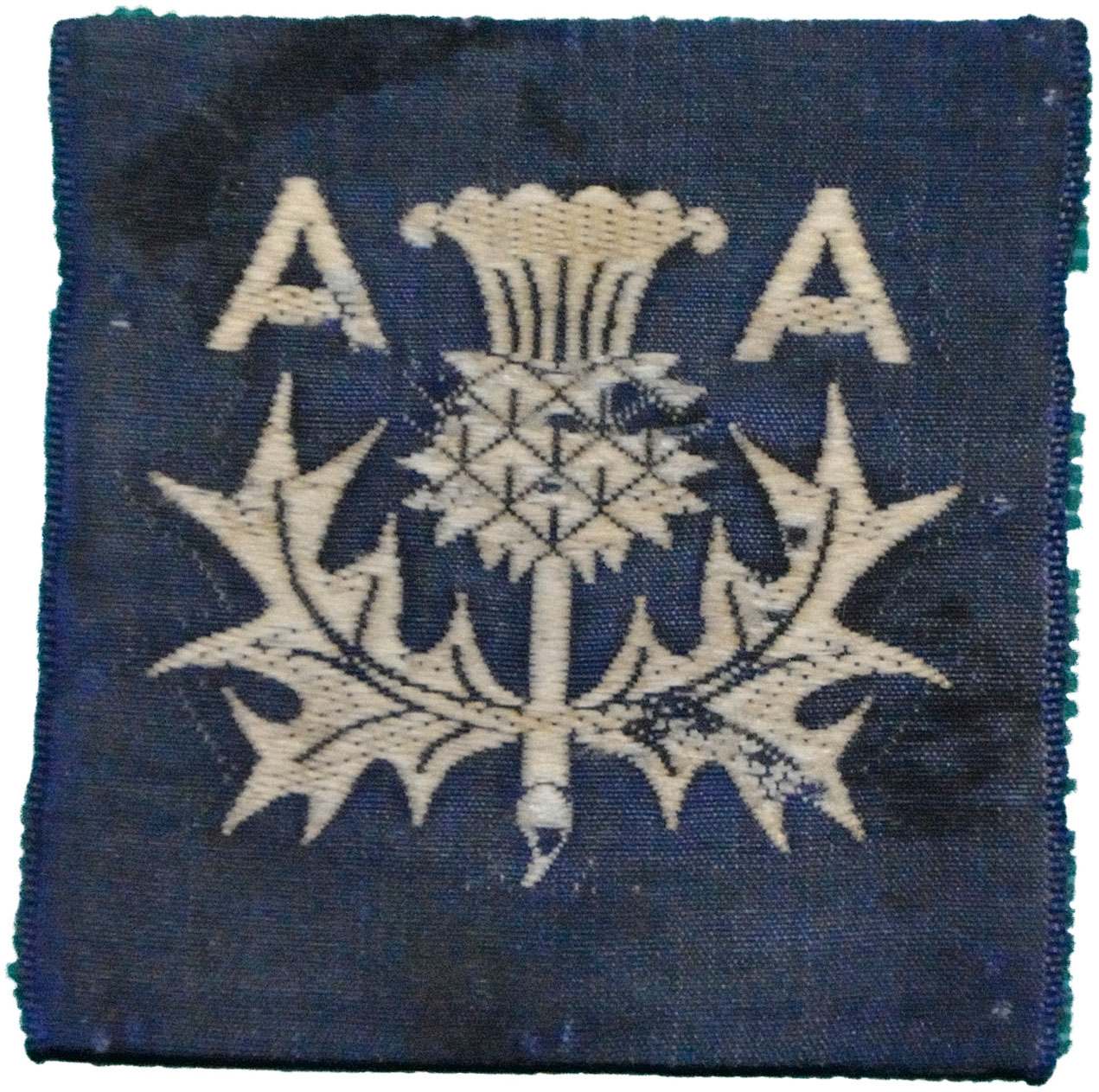
3 AA Divisional sign.

== World War II ==
=== Mobilisation ===
The regiment formed part of 3 AA Division covering Scotland. In February 1939 the TA's AA defences came under the control of a new Anti-Aircraft Command. In June a partial mobilisation of TA units was begun in a process known as 'couverture', whereby each AA unit did a month's tour of duty in rotation to man selected AA positions. On 24 August, ahead of the declaration of war, AA Command was fully mobilised at its war stations. 14th (West Lothian) LAA Rgt became part of 51st Light Anti-Aircraft Brigade, which was formed in August 1939 with responsibility for all of 3 AA Division's LAA provision.

=== Phoney War and Battle of Britain ===
3 AA Division was frequently in action during the so-called Phoney War that lasted from September 1939 to April 1940. The first action occurred unexpectedly on 16 October 1939, when enemy aircraft suddenly appeared out of cloud and dived on warships off Rosyth Dockyard, close to the Forth Bridge. Other attacks on bases followed, and 3 AA Division was given priority for new Heavy AA (HAA) guns in January 1940, but only 10 Bofors 40 mm guns and some Naval 2-pounders were available for LAA defence; otherwise LAA defence of Vulnerable Points (VPs) relied on AA Light machine guns (AALMGs). From April 1940 the Luftwaffe turned its attention to the campaigns in Norway and France and the Low Countries

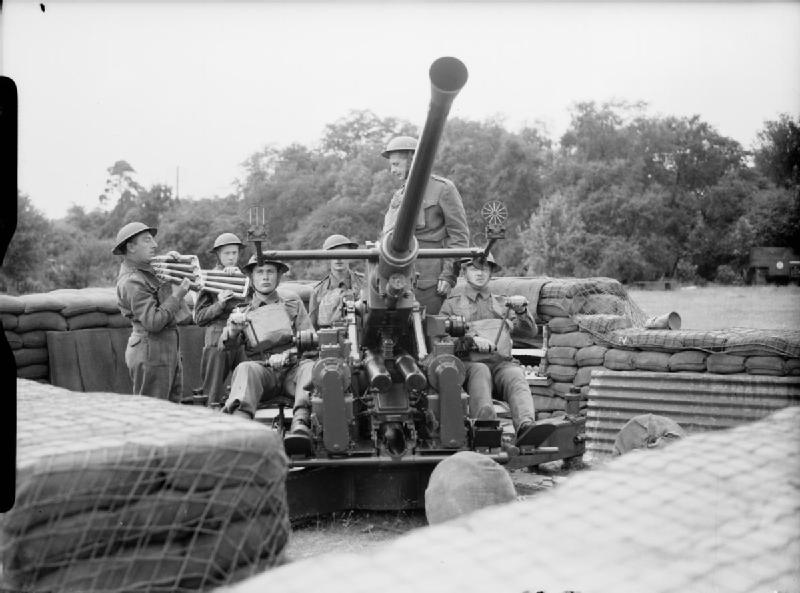
Bofors LAA gun in the UK, June 1940.

By 11 July 1940, at the start of the Battle of Britain, 3 AA Division had some 119 LAA guns (mainly Bofors) defending VPs. Scotland largely escaped air attack during the Battle of Britain, but in September 1940 the Luftwaffe shifted to night attacks on Britain's cities (The Blitz). However, even while the Blitz was getting under way there was also an urgent need to reinforce the AA defences of the British bases in Egypt following the entry of Italy into the war. 14th (West Lothian) LAA Rgt, under the command of Lieutenant-Colonel Gerald Eastwood, arrived in Egypt with 39, 40 and 57 LAA Btys on 3 March 1941 and was sent straight to Libya where it joined 4 AA Bde at Tobruk behind the advancing Western Desert Force. (58 LAA Battery had been transferred on 10 July 1940 to 50th Light Anti-Aircraft Regiment, Royal Artillery which remained in AA Command.)

=== Siege of Tobruk ===
German intervention in the shape of General Erwin Rommel and his Afrika Korps quickly turned the tide in Libya. A swift breakthrough pushed British forces backwards. The German columns, heading for the Egyptian frontier, bypassed Tobruk, whose garrison prepared to defend the port. This was invested from 11 April, beginning the epic Siege of Tobruk lasting 240 days.

Brigadier J.N. Slater of 4 AA Bde acted as AA Defence Commander (AADC) for the whole Tobruk area, with RHQ 14th LAA Rgt controlling the AA defences round the perimeter and RHQ 13th LAA Rgt commanding the harbour area. 13th LAA Regiment had previously sent a battery to Greece, so the numbers were balanced by transferring 39 LAA Bty to its command, though in fact batteries were split between the two LAA Rgt HQs for operational convenience rather than strict regimental integrity:

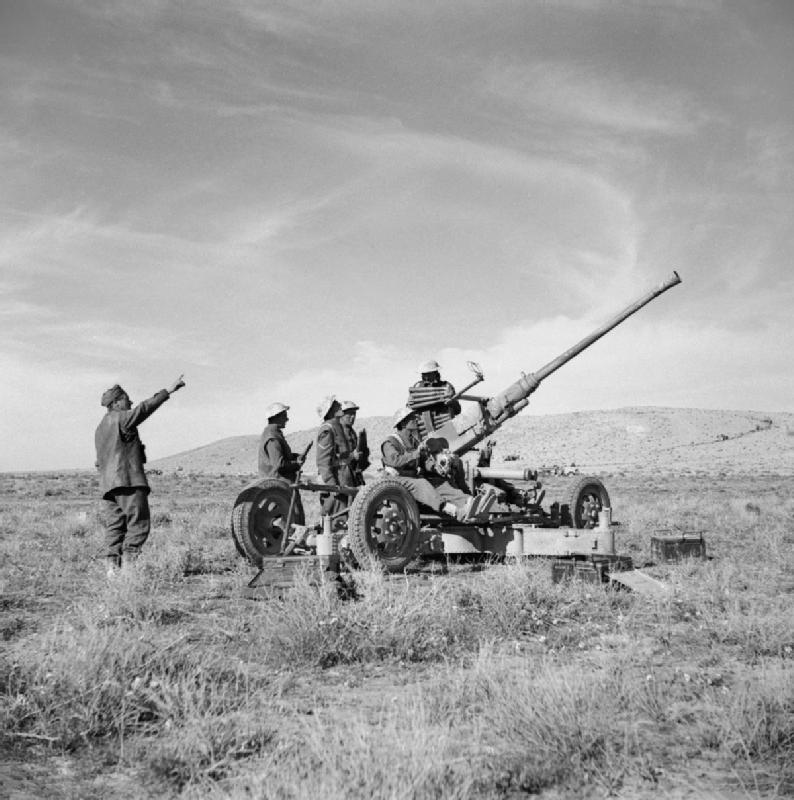
A Bofors gun in North Africa

Perimeter defended area

- RHQ 14th LAA Rgt – Lt-Col G.A. Eastwood
  - Troop of 38/13 LAA Bty – left in September
  - 39/14 LAA Bty – Maj J.T. Kidd
  - 57/14 AA Bty – Maj B.G. Ivory
  - 1 Independent LAA Bty – Maj H.H. Farr
  - 8 Australian LAA Bty – left in September
  - 13 LAA Rgt Workshop, Royal Army Ordnance Corps (RAOC)
  - 13 LAA Rgt Signal Section, Royal Corps of Signals (RCS)

while 40/14 LAA Bty (Maj W. McEwan Younger) was in the harbour area under 13th LAA Rgt.

In April the two LAA regiments and attached independent LAA batteries between them had 18 Bofors 40 mm guns (6 mobile, 12 static) and 42 captured Italian 20mm Breda guns, and all batteries manned a mixture of these weapons.

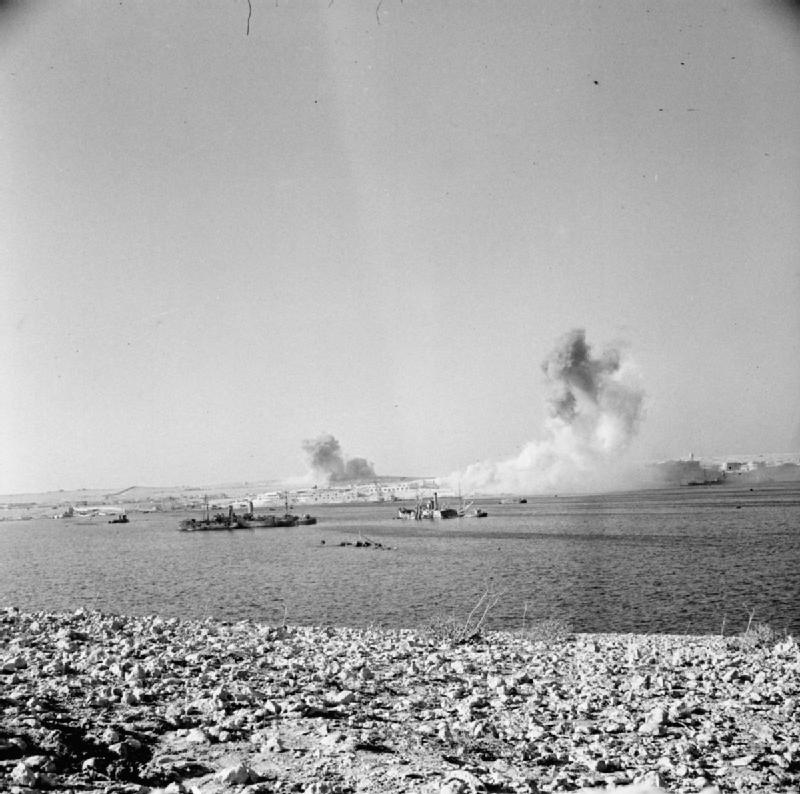
German bombs explode during one of the heaviest air raids on Tobruk. The photograph was taken from a trench adjoining an AA gun.

Rommel made his first attack on the perimeter before dawn on 14 April but was driven out by a counter-attack. Thereafter there were a number of attacks on the perimeter, but almost constant air attacks, particularly by Junkers Ju 87 Stukas. The LAA gunners had problems against the divebombing Stukas and the low-flying Messerschmitt Bf 109s, against which the guns' predictors were useless. With the gunsites themselves being targeted, the battery drivers, cooks and clerks manned LMGs for local protection. The Official History records that the AA artillery in Tobruk was 'incessantly in action against attacks of all kinds, from all heights, but especially by dive-bombers'.

Luftwaffe casualties were heavy: 53 aircraft shot down and 43 damaged in April, 45 and 56 in May. After that the Luftwaffe switched to high-level attacks. Whereas there were 21 raids by a total of 386 aircraft in April, by July this had fallen to just four raids by 79 aircraft. 4 AA Brigade recorded that there was a steady decline in numbers of aircraft attacking as the siege went on, with the attackers switching to high-level and night attacks. Despite hits on the gun positions and numerous casualties among the gunners, the RAOC workshops kept the guns serviceable and no gun was out of action for more than a few hours. During September and October 1941 most of the Tobruk garrison and some of the AA units were relieved, but RHQ and the three batteries of 14th LAA Rgt saw the whole siege through.

In November 1941 the British Eighth Army began a new offensive in the Western Desert (Operation Crusader), which succeeded in ending the Siege of Tobruk. The first phase of 'Crusader' lasted until January 1942, when Rommel counter-attacked and Eighth Army fell back and dug in along the Gazala Line. There was then a lull in the fighting while both sides reorganised.

=== Gazala to Tunisia ===
During the Battle of Gazala, beginning on 26 May, Rommel's Axis forces quickly broke into the British position and began attacking the defensive 'boxes'. After bitter fighting in the Gazala Line and the 'Cauldron', Eighth Army was forced to retreat. The British hoped to defend Tobruk as in the previous siege, but this time the Axis forces reached it before the defences were ready, and 4 AA Bde was among the 33,000 Allied troops who were captured in the fall of Tobruk. However, 14th LAA Rgt was not among them, having been outside the perimeter at the time. It was collected by 12 AA Bde, which had been defending fighter landing grounds for the Desert Air Force (DAF) and now fought a series of rearguard actions as the Eighth Army retreated in confusion beyond the Egyptian frontier. The Axis advance was finally halted at El Alamein

After a period out of the line, 14th LAA Rgt (39, 40, 57 LAA Btys with 48 Bofors guns) was back in 12 AA Bde for the Second Battle of El Alamein. 12 AA Brigade's role once again was to move up behind Eighth Army's advance and defend the DAF's landing grounds as they came into use. The brigade developed a very efficient system of providing rolling support for the DAF's tactical wings as they made long shifts forwards to maintain contact with the advancing army. This involved the Royal Air Force, Royal Engineers' airfield construction teams, and local ground defence units as well as the AA units; all were represented in the joint reconnaissance parties that followed closely behind the leading battalions. They selected new sites for landing strips or renovated old ones, maintaining radio contact through RAF or RA channels with the main body so that movement orders could be passed to the following AA batteries. Movement was usually by 'leap frogging' from previously occupied landing grounds, though sometimes an AA battery was waiting in a hidden concentration area ready to move forward. RAF transport aircraft flew ground staff, equipment and battery staffs to the new locations. Within a few hours the fighter squadrons would arrive and the AA positions were manned. 12 AA Brigade had 20–30 separate convoys moving on any given day, and by November it was providing cover for six RAF wings and one US Army Air Force Group. As the advance progressed the retreating Germans took greater pains to make abandoned landing grounds unusable; at one field near 'Marble Arch', 2000 mines had to be lifted by the RA/RE/RAF teams.

12 AA Brigade followed Eighth Army all the way to Tripoli, which fell on 23 January 1943. By now, 14th LAA Rgt (39, 40, 57 LAA Btys, 36 x Bofors) was at Buerat. The last phase of Eighth Army's operations in North Africa was the advance from Tripoli into Tunisia. 12 AA Brigade continued to conduct airfield defence, against increasing opposition. The typical mobile group allocated to an airfield contained one HAA and two LAA batteries. To avoid detection, the groups moved by night, being allotted special priority for routes. For the Battle of the Mareth Line in late March 1943 12 AA Bde covered nine forward landing grounds for five RAF wings, all within 20 miles (32 km) of enemy positions. The standard procedure was for both HAA and LAA guns to be sited to engage potential attacks by tanks as well as aircraft, and to be tightly integrated with the ground defence units. Air raid engagements could be complicated by the presence of friendly aircraft using the airfield. After Mareth the units of 12 AA Brigade also began to take on responsibility for ports on the Tunisian coast. The advance ended at Enfidaville after seven months and 1,500 miles (2,400 km) of continuous movement, and the AA gunners began a programme of rest and refitting, while contributing to the AA defence of the ports from which the Allied invasion of Sicily (Operation Husky) was to be launched.

=== Operation Avalanche ===
14th LAA Regiment was not involved in Sicily, but instead sailed with 12 AA Bde direct from Tunisia to the landings on mainland Italy at Salerno (Operation Avalanche) starting on 9 September. The regiment's task was to defend Montecorvino Airfield, but although this was rushed before the Luftwaffe aircraft could fly off, the airfield remained under heavy and accurate enemy bombardment until 13 September and the LAA guns could not be effectively deployed until this ceased. The bridgehead was dangerously congested and so the intended AA reinforcements could not be brought in safely; the units already ashore had to meet all demands against multiple air raids delivered simultaneously with little warning. The Germans were finally forced to retire on 16 September. 12 AA Brigade was keen to follow up quickly with a column of mobile AA troops to Naples, but this bold plan was vetoed. The brigade's units began to arrive in Naples by road and sea (having re-embarked in landing craft) on 1 October. This deployment only lasted three weeks before they moved on again to the River Volturno, where they were required to provide cover for routes, bridges, landing-grounds and field gun positions for X Corps' assault crossing of the river. The Luftwaffe was very active in trying to prevent the crossings, particularly using Bf 109s and Focke-Wulf Fw 190s as fighter-bombers. During 1943 Lt-Col Eastwood was promoted to command 12 AA Bde.

Once across the Volturno, operations slowed down as the Allies faced the German Winter Line. 12 AA Brigade's units were deployed around Capua, Cancello and Grazzanise from October to December. Then in January 1944, they moved forward to cover the assembly areas and ferry sites for the crossing of the Garigliano, after which the brigade passed to XIII Corps for the Rapido river crossings and the advance up the Liri Valley (Operation Diadem). Its LAA regiments were committed to bridges, defiles, assembly areas and artillery positions, and enemy aircraft were active in low-level strafing and bombing. There were severe problems in getting the AA guns forward along the heavily congested routes. As XIII Corps advanced on a narrow front, 12 AA Bde found itself stretched along 80 miles (130 km) of roads protecting the long 'tail'. After the breakout from the Anzio beachhead and the capture of Rome in early June, 12 AA Bde was deployed in the Tiber plain protecting airfields, river crossings etc.

In August, 12 AA Bde and its units were transferred to Eighth Army on the Adriatic front. Over the next six months the army advanced only 100 miles (160 km), finally reaching the Gothic Line. During this period the brigade mainly supported I Polish Corps. AA units were hampered by lack of early warning radar, while enemy aircraft were initially very active. However, Luftwaffe activity declined towards the end of the year, and the Allied forces in Italy were suffering an acute manpower shortage, so surplus AA gunners were transferred to other roles and several units disbanded. Although 14th LAA Rgt remained in the order of battle, in common with other units that had been overseas for a long time it returned from Italy to the UK.

In the spring of 1945 14th LAA Rgt joined 5 AA Bde in East Anglia. After VE-day, AA Command was rapidly run down. In the autumn of 1945, 14th LAA Rgt transferred to 40 AA Bde in Scotland. In April 1946, the regiment was placed in suspended animation.

== Postwar ==
When the TA was reconstituted in 1947, the TA regiment and its three batteries was placed in suspended animation at Pilton Camp, Edinburgh, where the personnel continued in 14th LAA Rgt as a war-formed unit of the Regular Army, while the TA unit reformed at Linlithgow as 514 (West Lothian, Royal Scots) LAA Rgt.

=== 46 Light Anti-Aircraft Regiment ===
The war-formed unit was redesignated 46 LAA Regiment on 1 April 1947, with the following changes:

- 39 LAA Bty disbanded to resuscitate 28 Bty of 27/28 Med Bty as 117 LAA Bty
- 40 LAA Bty disbanded to resuscitate 253 Med Bty as 124 LAA Bty
- 57 LAA Bty disbanded to resuscitate 3 Bty of 1/3 Med Bty as 126 LAA Bty

The regiment was reduced to cadre on 26 July 1948 and placed in suspended animation on 16 August. However, RHQ and the three batteries were resuscitated on 15 September that year as 46 (Mixed) Heavy AA Regiment at Carter Barracks, Bulford Camp, Wiltshire. 'Mixed' indicated that members of the Women's Royal Army Corps were integrated into the unit. It was armed with 3.7-inch HAA guns/

This regiment in turn was reduced to cadre on 15 May 1955 at Hobbs Barracks, Lingfield, Surrey, only to be reformed in name on 16 June that year when 75 HAA Rgt (37, 150, 182 HAA Btys) at Milton Barracks, Gravesend, Kent, was redesignated as 46 HAA Rgt (117, 124, 126 HAA Btys).

From July 1957 to August 1958 the regiment served at Paphos in Cyprus, with RHQ, 124 and 126 Btys at Pinefields Camp, and 117 Bty split between St Barbara's Camp and Coral Bay. That regiment finally entered suspended animation on 31 October 1958 (117 Bty being formally disbanded on 1 January 1962).

=== 514 (West Lothian, Royal Scots) LAA Regiment ===
514 (West Lothian, Royal Scots) LAA Rgt formed part of 62 AA Bde (the prewar 36 (Scottish) AA Bde).

When AA Command was disbanded on 10 March 1955 there was a major reduction in the number of AA units in the TA. 514th LAA Regiment amalgamated with R Bty of 471 (Forth) HAA Rgt, 519th (Dunedin) LAA Rgt and 587 (Queen's Edinburgh Royal Scots) LAA Rgt to form a new 432 LAA Rgt with the following organisation:

- P (Queens Edinburgh, Royal Scots) Bty – from 587 LAA
- Q (West Lothian, Royal Scots) Bty – from 514 LAA
- R (City of Edinburgh) Bty – from 471 HAA
- S (Dunedin) Bty – from 519 LAA

A further reduction in 1961 saw 432 LAA Rgt converted to the Royal Engineers as part of 432 (City of Edinburgh) Corps Engineer Regiment, except Q (West Lothian, Royal Scots) Bty, which instead joined 445 (Cameronians) LAA Rgt on 1 May 1961 to form R (West Lothian) Bty in a new 445 (Lowland) LAA Rgt. In 1967 this regiment was disbanded and became concurrently part of 207 (Scottish) Bty in 102 (Ulster and Scottish) Light Air Defence Rgt, and T (Glasgow) Bty in the Lowland Rgt, RA (Territorials).

== Uniform and Insignia ==
The original uniform worn by the Linlithgowshire RVCs was dark Volunteer grey, a dark grey cap with ball tuft, and brown belts. The 1st RVC had scarlet piping, the other three had scarlet facings. In 1863 the combined battalion adopted Rifle green uniforms with red facings; the headgear was a shako, replaced by a rifle busby with a black-and-red plume and bugle badge in 1872. In 1876 the lower part of the plume was changed to light green, and the tunic cuffs were changed to rifle green with a light green Austrian knot. About 1890 the brown belts were replaced by black Slade-Wallace equipment, the facings were changed to red piping on the collar and a red crow's foot on the cuff, and the lower part of the busby plume was changed from green to red. This uniform was replaced in 1903 by a drab service dress with red piping and a Glengarry bonnet with Royal Scots badge, buff belts, and black leggings. In 1908 the battalion adopted the scarlet full dress with blue facings of the Royal Scots.

== Honorary colonel ==
Archibald Primrose, 5th Earl of Rosebery (the future Prime Minister) held the position of honorary colonel of the battalion from 18 April 1874 until 1920.

== Memorial ==
A gun captured at Archangel by 2/10th Bn is preserved at Glencorse Barracks, the former depot of the Royal Scots.

== External sources ==
- Mark Conrad, The British Army, 1914 (archive site)
- British Army units from 1945 on
- The Long, Long Trail
- The Regimental Warpath 1914–1918 (archive site)
- Land Forces of Britain, the Empire and Commonwealth (Regiments.org - archive site)
- Royal Artillery 1939–1945
- The Royal Scots
- Graham Watson, The Territorial Army 1947
