= Queen's Edinburgh Rifles =

Queen's Edinburgh Rifles 4th/5th (Queen's Edinburgh Rifles) Battalion, Royal Scots 52nd (Queen's Edinburgh, Royal Scots) S/L Rgt, RA 130th (Queen's Edinburgh, Royal Scots) LAA Rgt, RA 587 (Queen's Edinburgh, Royal Scots) LAA Rgt, RA
- Active: 31 August 1859 – 1 May 1961
- Country: United Kingdom
- Branch: Territorial Army
- Role: Infantry; Air Defence
- Part of: 52nd (Lowland) Division; 29th Division; 32nd Division; 65th (2nd Lowland) Division; Anti-Aircraft Command
- Garrison/HQ: Edinburgh
- Colors: Hunting Stuart Tartan (Pipers, Royal Stewart)
- March: I'm Ninety-Five
- Engagements: Second Boer War; World War I: Gallipoli Campaign; Sinai and Palestine Campaign; Western Front World War II: Home defence; Operation Diver

Commanders
- Notable commanders: James, Lord Moncrieff; John Macdonald, Lord Kingsburgh; Sir Robert Cranston

The Queen's Edinburgh Rifles was a brigade of Rifle Volunteers raised in the county of city of Edinburgh in 1859. It later formed two battalions of the Royal Scots, which fought in World War I at Gallipoli, in Palestine and on the Western Front. The two battalions combined between the world wars before being converted into an air defence regiment of the Royal Artillery (RA). This served in Anti-Aircraft Command during World War II and continued in the postwar Territorial Army (TA) until 1961, when its successors were converted into Royal Engineers (RE).

== Volunteer Force ==
The enthusiasm for the Volunteer movement following an invasion scare in 1859 saw the creation of many Rifle Volunteer Corps (RVCs) composed of part-time soldiers eager to supplement the Regular British Army in time of need. The 1st City of Edinburgh RVC comprised 21 different companies raised in that city between 31 August 1859 and November 1860 under the command of James Moncrieff, MP for Edinburgh (later 1st Lord Moncrieff), as Lieutenant-Colonel Commandant. Nine of these companies were professional by background (lawyers, accountants, civil servants, university men and merchants), four were drawn from miscellaneous interests (Freemasons, Total abstainers, the Highland Society of Edinburgh), two were citizens' companies, two were lower middle class (tailors and bankers' clerks) and four were artisan companies:

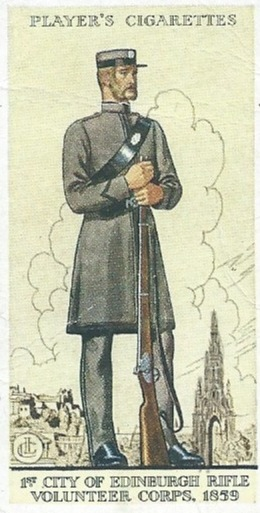
Queen's Edinburgh Rifles, 1859.

- 1st (Advocates) Company, formed 31 August 1859, disbanded 1868
- 2nd (1st Citizens) Company, formed 31 August 1859
- 3rd (Writers to the Signet) Company, formed 31 August 1859, disbanded 1868
- 4th (Edinburgh University) Company, formed 31 August 1859
- 5th (Solicitors before the Supreme Court) Company, formed 31 August 1859
- 6th (Accountants) Company, formed 31 August 1859
- 7th (Bankers) Company, formed 31 August 1859
- 8th (1st Artisans) Company, formed 31 August 1859
- 9th (2nd Artisans) Company, formed 31 August 1859
- 10th (Civil Service) Company, formed 7 October 1859
- 11th (3rd Artisans) Company, formed 7 December 1859
- 12th (Freemasons) Company, formed 7 December 1859, reorganised as 12th (Water of Leith) Company 1861
- 13th (4th Artisans) Company, formed 7 December 1859
- 14th (2nd Citizens) Company, formed 8 December 1859
- 15th (1st Merchants) Company, formed 21 December 1859
- 16th (Total Abstainers) Company, formed 29 February 1860
- 17th (2nd Merchants) Company, formed 11 May 1860
- 18th (High Constables) Company, formed 25 May 1860
- 19th (5th Artisans) Company, formed 8 November 1860
- 1st (Highland) Company formed 31 August 1859
- 2nd (Highland) Company formed 18 May 1860
- 3rd (Highland) Company formed 23 July 1860

The author R. M. Ballantyne was appointed Ensign in No 13 (4th Artisans) Company, and then promoted to be Captain of No 9 (2nd Artisans) Company in July 1860, resigning in July 1863. He rejoined the corps in 1867 as Captain of No 15 (1st Merchants) Company, but resigned again at the end of 1869. His brother John was one of the first officers appointed to the corps, being commissioned as ensign in No 2 (1st Citizens) Company and then selected as Captain of No 14 (2nd Citizens) Company on its formation, before resigning in June 1860.

The first six companies were self-supporting, the members paying for their own uniforms, equipment and arms, while No 7 Company composed of bank clerks, No 15 (1st Merchants) and No 19, mainly tailors, received financial support from their employers. The other artisans paid for their uniforms by instalments and their company expenses were met by public subscriptions. The three Highland Companies came from the Highland Society of Edinburgh. Interest in No 12 Company, the Freemasons, soon fell away and by 1861 it had almost ceased to exist. The novelist Catherine Sinclair came forward with funds and No 12 Company was reorganised, recruited mainly from the Water of Leith district.

In 1865 the unit received the title of 1st Queen's Edinburgh Rifle Volunteer Brigade (1st QERVB). A 2nd City of Edinburgh RVC had been formed in 1862 as one company of Highlanders raised from W.D. Young's Ironworks at Fountainbridge with William D. Young himself as captain. On 23 February 1867 this unit was increased to three companies, but simultaneously was included in the 1st QERVB as the 4th, 5th and 6th (Highland) Companies.

No 16 Company had been formed by John Hope entirely from men who had 'signed the pledge' as total abstainers. Hope then decided to raise a complete corps of abstainers from Edinburgh and on 27 May 1867 the 3rd City of Edinburgh RVC of two companies was formed with Hope in command. Most of his recruits (and the cap badge) were taken from No 16 Company, and the 3rd RVC remained administratively attached to the 1st QERVB for several years. The unit, known locally as 'John Hope's Water Rats', grew to six companies by 1880, when it was renumbered as the 2nd Edinburgh RVC. It became the 4th Volunteer Battalion of the Royal Scots in 1888, and the 6th Battalion, Royal Scots in 1908.

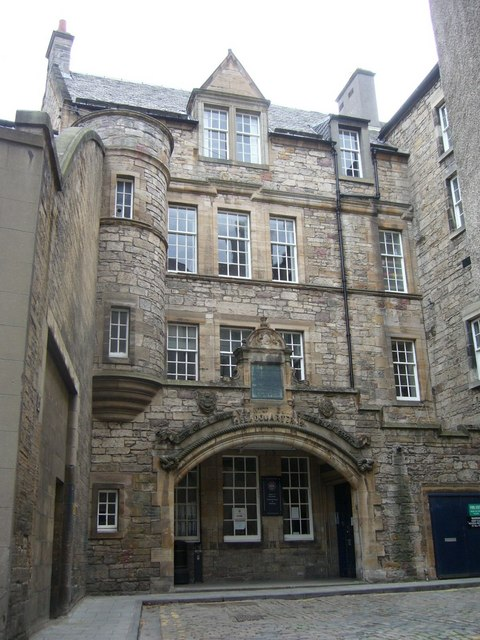
The QER Drill Hall at Forrest Hill.

The 1st QERVB continued to grow, adding a 7th (Highland) Company on 27 December 1867 from natives of Caithness living in Edinburgh. Nos 1 and 3 Companies were disbanded in 1868 but on 19 March 1869 a new No 20 Company was formed and the brigade divided into two battalions: 1st Battalion comprised Nos 2, 4, 5. 6, 7, 10, 18 and 1st to 7th Highland Companies; 2nd Battalion comprised Nos 8, 9, 11, 12, 13, 14, 15, 16, 17, 19 and 20 Companies. It was the largest RVC in the Volunteer Force. The unit established its Headquarters (HQ) at Forrest Hill drill hall, Edinburgh, in 1872, and enlarged the building in 1905. In common with other Edinburgh Volunteer units, it used a rifle range at Hunters Bog in Holyrood Park.

J.H.A. Macdonald, later Lord Kingsburgh, Lord Advocate of Scotland, was commissioned as a Lt-Col in the brigade in 1864 and became Lt-Col Commandant in 1882. He was one of the leading Volunteer advocates of drill reform, author of On the Best Detail Formation for the New Infantry Tactics (1873) and Commonsense on Parade or Drill without Strings (1886). In 1885 he organised a spectacular night assembly of the brigade, which resulted in 500 new recruits. In 1886 a Mounted Infantry detachment was formed and an affiliated cadet corps was formed at Merchiston Castle School.

=== Localisation ===
Under the 'Localisation of Forces' scheme introduced in 1872 by the Cardwell Reforms, the 1st QERVB was grouped with the 1st Regiment of Foot (the Royal Scots), the Edinburgh Light Infantry Militia and a number of RVCs from neighbouring counties into Brigade No 62. When these were combined into a single regiment under the Childers Reforms, the 1st QERVB provided two Volunteer Battalions of the Royal Scots from 1 July 1881. The 2nd Battalion formed a Mounted Rifle company in March 1886. On 1 April the unit was designated the Queens Rifle Volunteer Brigade Royal Scots, when it was split into three battalions: 1st Battalion with A-I Companies (previously Nos 2, 5, 6, 7, 10, 18 and 1–3 Highland); 2nd Battalion A–H Companies (previously Nos 8, 9, 11–16); 3rd Battalion A–H Companies (previously Nos 4, 17, 19, 20 and 4–7 Highland).

The Stanhope Memorandum of December 1888 introduced a Mobilisation Scheme for Volunteer units, which would assemble in their own brigades at key points in case of war. In peacetime these brigades provided a structure for collective training. Under this scheme the QRVB was included in the Forth Brigade under the command of Col J.H.A. Macdonald, based at 51 Hanover Street, Edinburgh, later at Surgeons' Hall. In 1902 the Forth Brigade was split into the 1st and 2nd Lothian Brigades, with the QVRB in the 1st Brigade based at the QRVB Drill Hall in Forrest Road, later at 28 Rutland Street.

=== 2nd Boer War ===
A contingent from the brigade served in the Volunteer Service Companies of the Royal Scots alongside the Regulars in the Second Boer War, and others with the Scottish Volunteer Cyclist Company and the City of London Imperial Volunteers. In all, 245 members of the brigade served in the war, earning its first Battle honour: South Africa 1900–02.

In 1900, during the 2nd Boer War, the Government provided support (army pay and allowances, with separation allowances for families) for longer than usual summer training camps for the Volunteers. This allowed the Queen's Edinburgh Rifle Brigade to camp for 28 days instead of the usual week, and to concentrate on progressive training. From 1902 to 1906 the brigade provided one battalion to the 32nd Brigade of the field army for 13 days' annual training, the remainder staying with 1st Lothian Bde.

Recruitment soared during the Boer War and the brigade underwent further enlargement in 1900, with the addition of I Company (recruited from Colinton) for 3rd Battalion, and the expansion of the Mounted Infantry detachment to three sections. In 1875 the brigade's highland companies had been ordered to discontinue Highland dress, but in 1900 a complete new Highland Battalion of eight kilted companies was formed in Edinburgh. This was detached from the brigade the following year and became independent as 9th (Highlanders) Volunteer Battalion, Royal Scots.

In 1905, Sir Robert Cranston, as one of the lieutenant-colonels of the brigade (as well as its Honorary Colonel, ex officio, as Lord Provost of Edinburgh), participated in meetings with H. O. Arnold-Forster, Secretary of State for War, over the future of the Volunteer Force. George Watson's Boys' College formed an affiliated cadet corps in 1905.

== Territorial Force ==
When the Volunteers were subsumed into the new Territorial Force (TF) under the Haldane Reforms of 1908, the three battalions of the brigade were reorganised to form the 4th and 5th Battalions of the Royal Scots, both granted the subtitle 'Queen's Edinburgh Rifles' in March 1909. A Company of the brigade's 3rd Bn, the old No 4 (Edinburgh University) Company, became the Edinburgh University contingent of the Senior Division of the Officers' Training Corps (OTC) and the Merchiston Castle and George Watson's Cadet Corps joined the Junior Division of the OTC.

The two battalions remained in the Lothian Brigade, which did not join any of the TF's new infantry divisions but continued independently in its coast defence role.

== World War I ==
=== Mobilisation ===
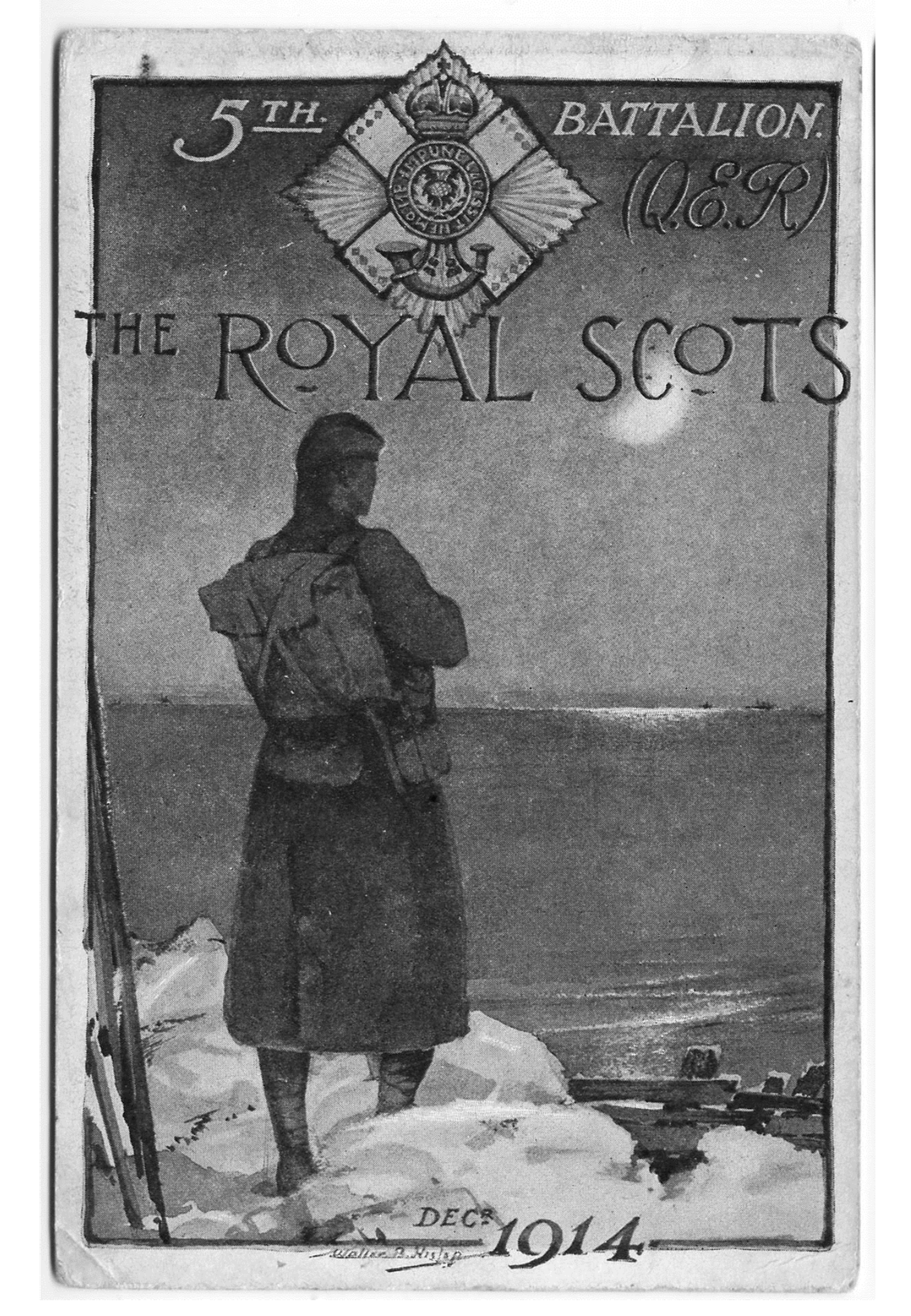
1914 Christmas card by the artist Walter Balmer Hislop, who served in D Company, 1/5th (QER) Bn, as 2nd Lt and died at Gallipoli in April 1915.

On the outbreak of war on 4 August 1914, the Lothian Brigade mobilised at Edinburgh as part of Scottish Coastal Defences.

Almost immediately, TF units were invited to volunteer for Overseas Service. On 15 August 1914, the War Office issued instructions to separate those men who had signed up for Home Service only, and form them into reserve units. On 31 August, the formation of a reserve or 2nd Line unit was authorised for each 1st Line unit where 60 per cent or more of the men had volunteered for Overseas Service. The titles of these 2nd Line units would be the same as the original, but distinguished by a '2/' prefix, and a 2nd Lothian Brigade was formed from these units. 3rd Line training units were formed in 1915. The only TF battalion of the Royal Scots that did not immediately form a 2nd line was the 6th Bn, which instead provided two companies of reinforcements to bring 1/4th Bn up to war establishment. 3rd Line or Reserve battalions were later added to provide drafts to the battalions overseas, but the number of recruits from Edinburgh began to dry up and drafts were often unavailable. In preparation for the Gallipoli Campaign, 1/5th Royal Scots left 1st Lothian Bde on 10 March 1915, and 1/4th Bn on 24 April, being replaced by their 2nd Line battalions.

=== 1/4th (QER) Royal Scots ===
On leaving 1st Lothian Bde the 1/4th (QER) Bn Royal Scots (1/4th RS) joined the Scottish Rifles Brigade in the Lowland Division, which were shortly afterwards numbered as 156th Bde and 52nd Division. The division was at Larbert under orders to proceed to Gallipoli, and on 22 May the battalion entrained for Liverpool where it embarked on the Empress of Britain. The battalion sailed on 24 May via Gibraltar and Malta, arriving on 3 June at Alexandria in Egypt where it went into camp.

==== Gallipoli ====
The battalion re-embarked on the Empress of Britain on 8 June and reached Mudros Bay three days later. C Company was then sent aboard the Carron for Cape Helles, followed by A and B Companies aboard HMS Reindeer. The latter vessel was badly damaged in a collision with HMS Immingham and had to return, the men being transhipped to the French Moulooya and then back to the Empress of Britain. A and B Companies with HQ finally sailed again on 14 June aboard HMS Basilisk, accompanied by D Company aboard HMS Grasshopper. They landed at 'W' Beach and moved about a mile inland to begin digging communication tenches under shellfire. The battalion moved up into the front line where it relieved the 1/5th (QER) Bn (see below) for a five-day spell of duty, during which Quartermaster-Sergeant J. Dewar (1914 winner of the King's Prize at the National Rifle Association meeting at Bisley Camp) and Company Sergeant-Major (CSM) D. Lowe distinguished themselves by picking off Turkish snipers.

1/4th Battalion returned to the front line on 27 June to take part in the next day's attack on trenches H12A and H12 (the Battle of Gully Ravine) in which 156th Bde was attached to 29th Division. After a bombardment by warships and the artillery ashore, 29th Division attacked at 11.00. 1/4th Royal Scots on 156th Bde's left had the task of assaulting trenches H12 and H12A on the eastern side of Gully Ravine. The battalion had a 12-man bombing party, but two-thirds of the improvised Jam tin grenades failed to go off. Each man had a tin rectangle on his back to reflect the sun and indicate their position to the artillery – but 156th Bde was allocated none of the available artillery support. Packed into inadequate jumping-off trenches, the brigade suffered heavily from retaliatory shellfire before it went 'over the top' at 11.02. C and D Companies advanced towards H12A, with A Company following up, all suffering heavy casualties from enfilade fire, including most of the officers. Pipe-Major Andrew Buchan, rifle in hand, led forward one party until hit for the third time he died on the parapet of the trench. After a stiff bayonet fight, this trench was captured. B Company diverged half right and charged the enfilading trench, then a party under CSM Lowe moved on to establish a foothold in the second objective (H12) and prepare it for defence, joined by the battalion machine guns. The battalion's casualties were 15 officers killed or died of wounds (including the Commanding Officer (CO), Lt-Col S.R. Dunn, TD, who died on a hospital ship), 204 other ranks (ORs) killed or missing, seven officers and 141 ORs wounded.

The battalion was relieved the following day and was then attached to 88th Brigade in 29th Division alongside the 1/5th (QER) Bn. It formed X and Y Companies in a composite battalion with the 1/7th Bn (Z Company), which had started as a half battalion, having lost two companies in the Quintinshill rail disaster before embarkation, and had since also lost heavily at Gully Ravine.

On 12 July the battalion supported 1/4th Royal Scots Fusiliers during the attack on Trenches E10 and F12 (the action at Achi Baba Nullah); its casualties were 27 ORs killed and missing, and 47 wounded. The weakened battalion was engaged in fatigue duties at 'W' Beach until 11 August when 14 officers (including a new CO, Col A. Young, VD, a former officer of the QEVRB) arrived as reinforcements and the temporary amalgamation with 1/7th Bn ended. 1/4th Battalion then began to take its turns in the firing line and in the reserve line, though at one point it held 120 yards (110 m) of trench for four days with an effective rifle strength of only 62 men. Sickness kept many men out of action: in October, of 12 officers and 330 ORs, the effective strength was only 181. On 4 November Col Young went to hospital and the 1/4th RS once again formed a composite battalion with the 1/7th Bn, under the command of Lt-Col W.C. Peebles of 1/7th. The combined battalion seized a Turkish trench on 15 November with few casualties and held it against a counter-attack, but was not involved in any of 52nd Division's other major actions before the decision was made to evacuate the Helles positions.

Preparations for evacuation were made during early January while the force ashore was slimmed down. 4th/7th Royal Scots formed part of the rearguard, which made its way down to 'V' Beach after dark on 8 January. The battalion was evacuated by lighters and on 9 September sailed aboard HMS Prince George for Mudros. Of the battalion that had originally landed, only the medical officer and 148 ORs remained on the strength.

==== Egypt ====
After the evacuation of Helles the 52nd (L) Division moved back to Egypt. After reinforcement and concentration it went to El Qantara and on 2 March 1916 it took over part of No 3 Section of the Suez Canal defences. No 3 or Northern Section of the Canal defences had its outer flank anchored on the Mediterranean. Running inland were a series of redoubts manned by 1/4th RS and the rest of the infantry with machine guns and backed by artillery. On the night of 3/4 August a German and Turkish force attacked the position (the Battle of Romani), but 1/4th RS and saw little action. The attack was driven off by the British artillery. and the ANZAC Mounted Division, then the defenders moved to the counter-attack, though the pursuit bogged down in the appalling desert conditions of Sinai.

==== Palestine ====
After months of preparation the Eastern Expeditionary Force (EEF) crossed the Sinai Desert at the end of 1916 and prepared to invade Palestine, beginning the Sinai and Palestine Campaign. 52nd (L) Division was held in reserve during the 1st Battle of Gaza (26–27 March 1917) and was not committed. There followed several weeks of preparation for the 2nd Battle of Gaza. The first phase of the attack was carried out on 17 April, with 52nd (L) Division tasked with taking Ali Mansur and the adjoining hills. 156th Brigade was in reserve at Wadi Ghuzze, moving up during the night. On 19 April 156th Bde was ready to attack Mansura at 07.30 after a 2-hour bombardment, with 1/4th RS in the centre under the command of Lt-Col F.H. Goldthorpe. However, 155th (South Scottish) Bde got held up and 156th was pinned down, lying in the open for 5–6 hours and suffering casualties from shellfire before falling back at the end of the day. The battle ended on 20 April with both sides digging in, the 1/4th RS having suffered casualties of 1 officers and 13 ORs killed, 6 officers and 110 ORs wounded, and 4 ORs missing.

The assault on 'Umbrella Hill' and el Arish Redoubt.

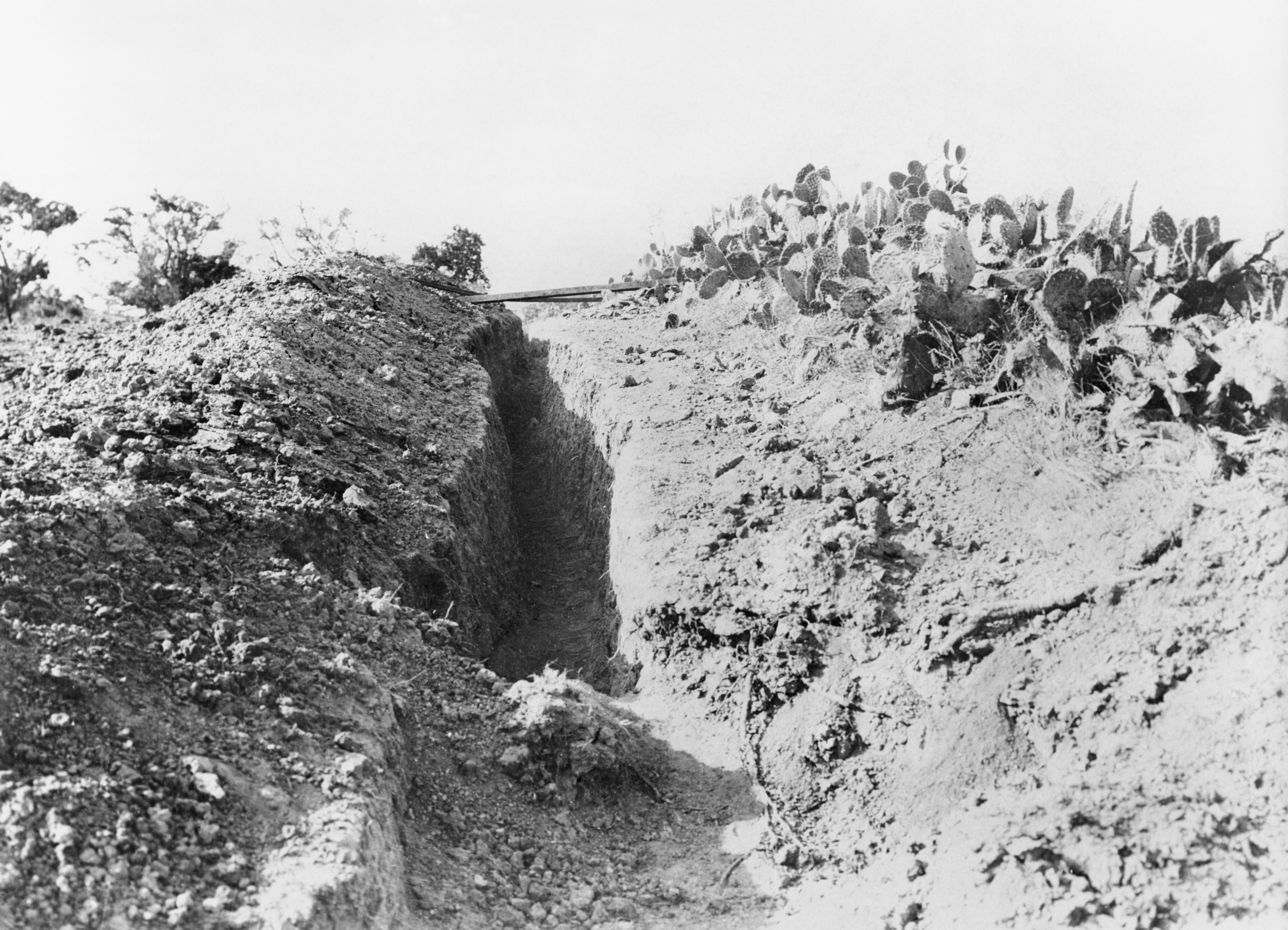
Turkish trenches at el Arish Redoubt captured by 4th Royal Scots.

52nd (L) Division spent months digging defences, suffering a steady trickle of casualties from shellfire and in raids. 4th Royal Scots (the '1/' prefix was dropped now that the 2nd and 3rd Line battalions had been disbanded, see below) was now commanded by Lt-Col A.M. Mitchell. Several times the battalion sent patrols out into No man's land with a field telephone, then, having located the position of a Turkish standing patrol, called down artillery fire on it. By the autumn of 1917 the EEF had been revitalised by the arrival of Sir Edmund Allenby as commander-in-chief, and the next operation (the 3rd Battle of Gaza) was much better planned and successful. While the Desert Mounted Corps swept round the Turkish flank, 52nd (L) Division down on the coast carried out a direct attack on the strong el Arish position to pin the Turks. 4th Royal Scots was given the daunting task of crossing 900 yards (820 m) of No man's land and then storming the central and eastern portion of the formidable el Arish redoubt and the associated 'Little Devil' trench system. The troops practised this attack over trench models for days before the attack went in on 2 November. The first phase of the night attack on 'Umbrella Hill' had died down before 4th RS moved out in the dark to its jumping-off position 500 yards (460 m) from the redoubt. Followed by supporting and carrying companies of the 8th Bn Cameronians (Scottish Rifles), and preceded by two tanks (one of which immediately broke down), 4th RS launched its attack at 03.00 as the British artillery pounded the objective. The battalion advanced 'with magnificent steadiness' in four waves on a frontage of 300 yards (270 m) under Turkish artillery fire (the remaining tank was hit and burned out after it had crossed the first two lines of trenches). The infantry crossed four lines of trenches, the following waves 'mopping up' the defenders as they advanced, and then they steadily cleared the 'Little Devil' trenches and dugouts, despite losses from landmines. The objective was carried by 03.55, but counter-attacks had to be held off until daybreak. Daylight showed that the furthest trench was untenable, so the battalion moved back a little to the higher ground from which they could deny these trenches to the enemy. Further counter-attacks came in at the end of the day, but the position was held. When the battalion was relieved that night it had lost about 200 casualties, which had risen to 240 by the end of the battle on 7 November.

The Turks withdrew to defend the Wadi el Hesi, with 52nd (L) Division well up in pursuit. 156th Brigade was left marching in the rear as the rest of the division stormed the wadi and led the pursuit up the coast towards Junction Station. 4th Royal Scots under Lt-Col Mitchell distinguished itself in a successful attack on a Turkish rearguard position at 'Brown Hill' near Burkah, 25 miles (40 km) NE of Gaza City on 11 November. The hill was strongly entrenched, but the battalion advanced 1 mile (1.6 km) under Shrapnel shell fire with one company echeloned back to protect the flank. Rushing forward in small parties, the assault wave gathered in the shelter of a wadi at the foot of the hill, and then attacked under covering fire from artillery and machine guns. Having taken the position the Royal Scots discovered a second untouched Turkish line hidden on the reverse slope; they were counter-attacked from this line and pushed part-way back down the hill, but led the reinforcing 2/3rd Gurkha Rifles back up the hill to capture the position before the end of the day. The battalion, already weak, lost 3 officers and 49 ORs killed, 4 officers and 157 ORs wounded.

The EEF now began its advance on Jerusalem. 52nd (L) Division had to negotiate a poor road through the hills beyond Beit Liqya in heavy rain to join the Battle of Nebi Samwil. 156th Brigade filed along the track in full view of the Turks and under shellfire as they moved up to relieve the Yeomanry Mounted Division. 4th Royal Scots under Lt-Col Mitchell was detached to move west of El Burj to extend 155th Bde's line to try to contact 54th (East Anglian) Division. The two brigades were now strung out in a very thin line and it was too rocky to dig trenches. Lt-Col Mitchell reported that the gap to the 54th Division was 2 miles (3.2 km) wide, but El Burj was held against Turkish attacks during 28 and 29 November until 155th Bde was relieved by the 3rd Australian Light Horse Bde and 4th Royal Scots could rejoin its own brigade. After breaking this counter-offensive, the EEF captured Jerusalem on 11 December.

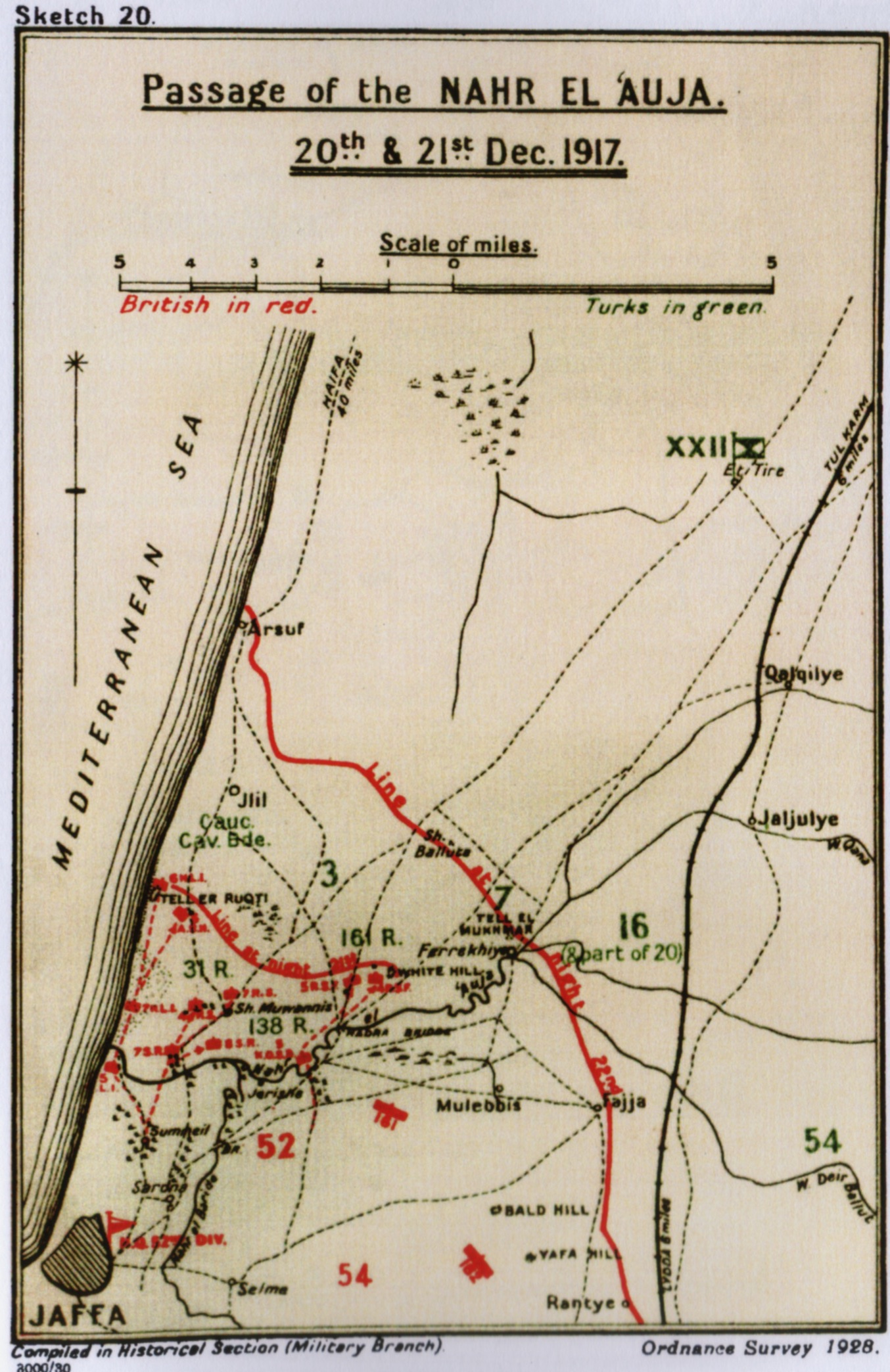
Passage of the Nahr el Auja

52nd (L) Division's next operation was the tricky passage of the Nahr el Auja to launch the Battle of Jaffa. A patrol of 4th RS crossed on a tarpaulin boat built by the Royal Engineers to reconnoitre the position on the night of 13/14 December. The assault troops of the division then practised using similar canvas boats on a village pond, then at 22.30 on the evening of 20 December, in heavy rain, the first assaulting waves of 156th Bde went forward under cover of an artillery barrage and established a bridgehead. Bridging was made difficult by the flooded river, but the Royal Engineers got the follow-up battalions including 4th Royal Scots across by raft. Accompanied by a section of the brigade machine gun company and a Stokes mortar the battalion attacked 'Slag Heap Farm' and captured it without serious difficulty. By 06.00 the brigade was digging in on a strong line, ready for any counter-attack, but none came: the Turks had been completely surprised, and were in full retreat. The advance was renewed up the coast on the morning of 22 December, with fire support from HMS Grafton and gunboats. 156th Brigade advancing in the centre came under shellfire, but casualties were few. Before nightfall, 52nd (L) Division reached the castle of Arsuf overlooking the Plain of Sharon, where it halted. The Official History describes the passage of the Auja as 'one of the most remarkable feats of the Palestine Campaign'. 4th Royal Scots suffered only 5 ORs killed, 1 officer and 21 ORs wounded.

==== Western Front ====
In the early part of 1918 the 52nd (L) Division remained in the lines near Arsuf. Then on 24 March it was warned for a transfer to the British Expeditionary Force (BEF) on the Western Front. The division's units sailed from Alexandria between 4 and 11 April, and landed at Marseille by 17 April. The division was concentrated near Abbeville on 23 April. On 29 April it moved to Aire and continued training. On 6 May it moved to the Vimy area and took over front line trenches. On 31 July it moved up to Arras to join in the Hundred Days Offensive.

On 22 August, 156th Bde was ordered to attack the following morning (the Second Battle of the Somme). Only half the promised number of lorries arrived, and some companies of 4th RS had to march through the night to their jumping-off point south of Mercatel, and there was no time for reconnaissance. The battalion marched straight into action, behind a heavy artillery barrage but without the three tanks that were supposed to accompany them. The attack was a surprise, and the battalion advanced through the wrecked villages, taking all their objectives by 06.45. The tanks then caught up and went out to exploit the ground in front, followed by a company of 4th RS, after which the position was consolidated.

The Battle of the Scarpe began on 26 August. 4th Royal Scots attacked north of the Cojeul River and advanced steadily until they reached the outer defences of the Hindenburg Line. On 2 September (the Battle of Drocourt-Quéant Line) 4th Royal Scots moved against the tremendously strong defences at the Quéant end of the Drocourt-Quéant Switch Line and took their objectives with amazing ease. The left of the battalion captured the Moulin Sans Souci windmill, and Lt-Col Mitchell pushed his reserve company into the gap to work along the Hindenburg Line trenches. From 22 to 26 August 4th RS lost 27 ORs killed and 10 missing, 3 officers and 114 ORs wounded, and 3 officers and 98 ORs gassed as the Germans deployed large quantities of Mustard Gas. The battalion was then rested until late September.

It was brought back into the line on 20 September facing a well-fortified section of the Hindenburg Line on the Canal du Nord. The British held Moeuvres, and the Germans had been counter-attacking the village. They made another attack against 7th RS on 21 September, but at the end of the day four platoons of 4th RS rushed and captured the Germans' strongpoint at E14 Central. Fighting continued around these positions after 4th RS had been relieved.

156th Brigade's role in the great Battle of the Canal du Nord was to attack across the canal, then turn to its right and clear the trenches to the south-east. The British barrage came down at 05.00 on 27 September and the German guns immediately replied on the forming-up trenches. Nevertheless, 4th RS under Lt-Col Mitchell led 156th Bde off at 05.30 as the barrage began to move forwards. They had no tanks because the banks of the dry canal were an obstacle, and on reaching the canal realised that a frontal assault would be very costly, so the battalion reorganised to work round the left flank. Corporal Foggo dashed forwards and threw two Mills bombs into a pillbox that held them up, and the men scrambled down into and across the canal. By 09.55 the battalion had reached their objective. The battalion's losses in defending Moeuvres were 6 officers and 81 ORs, and in forcing the Canal du Nord lost another 11 officers and 96 ORs.

52nd (L) Division took part in the pursuit after the Canal du Nord, before 4th RS were rested from 7 to 27 October. Then on 28 October the battalion went back into the line north east of St Amand for the Final Advance in Artois. The division had closed up to the Mons–Condé Canal by 8 November, when it became known that the Germans had abandoned the water defences. The code word 'Hunt' was issued, and 156th Bde crossed in canvas boats to begin the pursuit. By 10 November the brigade was clearing German rearguards from Herchies, near Mons. When the Armistice with Germany came into effect at 11.00 on 11 November the division had reached the Nimy–Jurbise road.

After the Armistice the troops were employed in training and clearing up the area. Demobilisation proceeded and between the end of January and end of May 1919 the division's units were reduced to cadres and returned to the UK. The 1/4th Bn was officially disembodied on 24 May 1919.

=== 1/5th (QER) Royal Scots ===
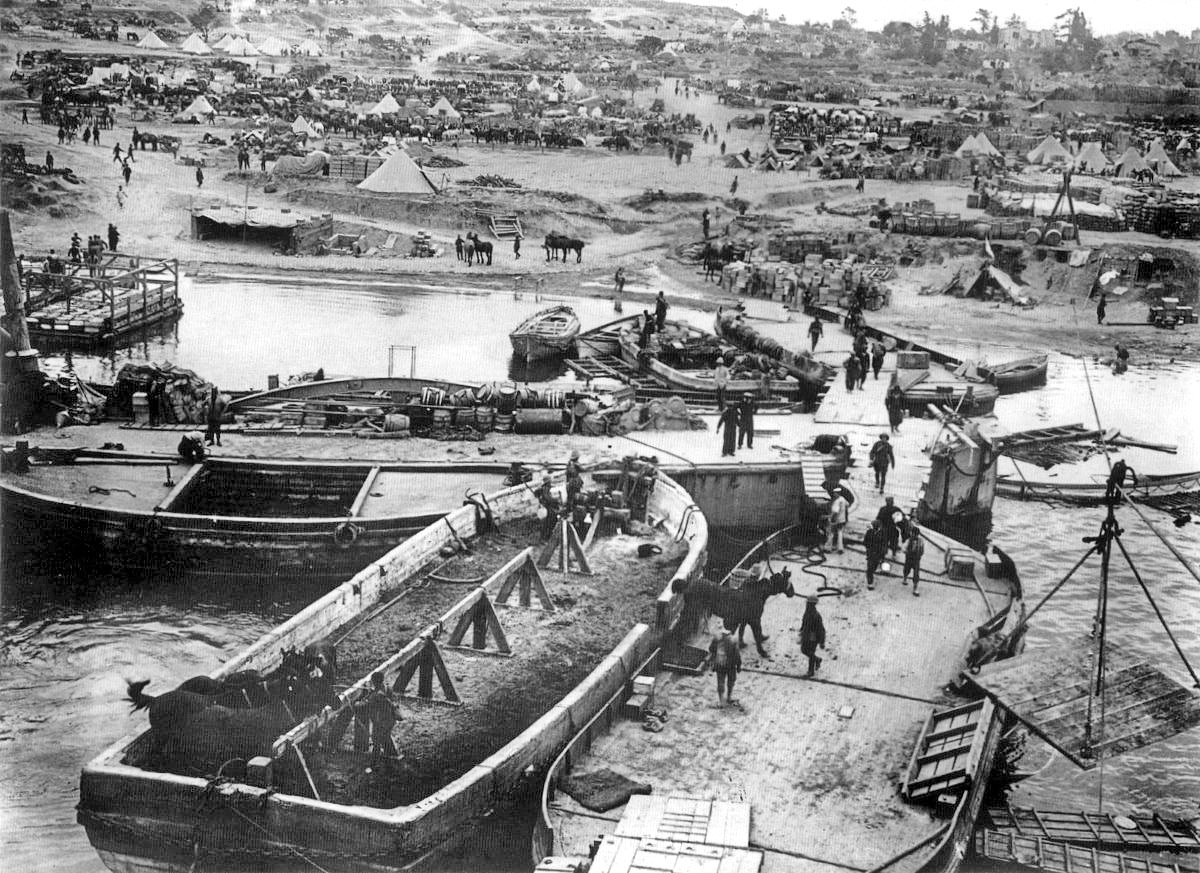
V Beach about two days after the landing, seen from the bow of the River Clyde.

The 1/5th (QER) Battalion, Royal Scots, joined 88th Bde in 29th Division at Leamington on 11 March 1915. It was the only TF battalion in what was otherwise a Regular Army formation composed of battalions brought back to the UK from around the British Empire following the outbreak of war. The battalion entrained for Avonmouth Docks on 21/22 March where it embarked on the Caledonia and the Melville and sailed via Malta to Alexandria where it disembarked on 2 April and went into camp. It re-embarked on 6 April aboard the Dongola, Haverford, Kingstonian, Marquette, and Melville for Mudros, where it joined the British forces gathering for the Landing at Cape Helles. After lying anchored off Tenedos the force began landing at 07.00 on 25 April. Two companies of 1/5th Bn landed at V Beach at 12.30 without casualties and moved forward to the support trenches. The other two companies landed later to provide working parties on the beach, unloading stores under fire and suffering casualties. One of the advanced companies was moved up into the firing line on 26 April and the battalion joined in the general advance against Achi Baba Ridge the following afternoon. By 08.00 on 28 April the battalion had suffered heavy casualties, including the CO, Lt-Col J.T.R. Wilson wounded, and had to be withdrawn from the advanced positions. The battalion was moved to the left where it began building a redoubt, and then moved back to reserve positions.

On 7 May, during the operations around Krithia Nullah, 1/5th RS were able to rush the Turkish strongpoint of Fir Tree Wood; it was then lost to a counter-attack, but 88th Bde had recovered it by the end of the day. Overall, however the fighting was inconclusive. 88th Brigade again took terrible casualties in the Battle of Gully Ravine on 28 June (see above). At one point Second lieutenant Herbert James of the 4th Bn Worcestershire Regiment found some platoons of 1/5th RS without any officers and led them into the first line of Turkish trenches, for which he was awarded the Victoria Cross.

The attack of 28 June was the last major action at Gallipoli for the 1/5th RS. Reduced to less than a company's strength and with no drafts from home, it was evacuated to Mudros in July for rest and was replaced in 29th Division by the Royal Newfoundland Regiment from the 1st Lothian Bde. Rebuilt to half-battalion strength, about 300 men, the 1/5th RS returned to the Gallipoli Peninsula in August for two more spells of trench duty, including being in reserve for 88th Bde's attack on 6 August and the Battle of Scimitar Hill, before being withdrawn to Egypt in October. On 10 March 1916 the battalion embarked at Port Said for France to join the British Expeditionary Force (BEF) on the Western Front.

=== 5th/6th Royal Scots ===
After arriving in France on 22 March the weak 1/5th RS was assigned to Line of communication (LoC) duties in April 1916. Then on 15 May it was amalgamated with the 1/6th Royal Scots to form the 5th/6th Bn. Having contributed large drafts to the 1/4th (QER) Bn, 1/6th Bn did not leave the Lothian Bde until 5 September 1915 and went to Egypt where it joined the Western Frontier Force (WFF) on 20 November. After serving with the WFF in the Senussi Campaign it was sent to France on 27 February 1916 for LoC duties on the Western Front. 1/6th arrived at Marseille on 15 May 1916 and was immediately amalgamated with 1/5th.

On 29 July the combined 5th/6th RS joined 14th Bde in 32nd Division. The 32nd was a Kitchener's Army formation that had been bolstered by the Regular 14th Bde. It had suffered heavy casualties on the First day of the Somme (1 July) and 5th/6th Royal Scots replaced one of its shattered battalions.

At dawn on 16 November, 14th Bde took over an ill-defined section of line forming a defensive flank to the attacks being made in the Battle of the Ancre Heights. Following a fall of snow and chilling rain, the brigade was ordered to push the flank forward 500 yards (460 m) towards 'Ten Tree Alley' when the rest of the division attacked on 18 November. Little headway was made in this last gasp of the Somme offensive.

The division took part in minor operations along the Ancre in January and February 1917, and then followed the German retreat to the Hindenburg Line (Operation Alberich) in March and April. During this pursuit the 32nd Division carried out the British Army's first open warfare operation on the Western Front since 1914. By nightfall on 1 April, 14th Bde had reached Holnon Wood. At 05.00 on 2 April it put in a successful attack and captured this large wood.

In June the division was moved to the Flanders coast to support an expected breakthrough at Ypres that never came. However, the Germans put in a spoiling attack at Nieuport (Operation Strandfest) on 10–11 July, preceded by three days of bombardment. 14th Brigade was not closely engaged, and a planned counter-attack was abandoned.

The Germans launched their Spring Offensive (Operation Michael) south of Arras in March 1918 and 32nd Division was sent to the area as reinforcements. On 3 April, 14th Bde took part in the night attack to recapture Ayette, and on 5 April the final attempt to relaunch Operation Michael was defeated at the Battle of the Ancre. During May and June, which was quiet on the British front, the 5th/6th RS carried out raids.

The Allied Hundred Days Offensive began on 8 August with the Battle of Amiens. 32nd Division was in reserve on the first day, though 5th/6th RS was briefly engaged. 14th Brigade then led the division's attack on 11 August, with 5th/6th RS and 1st Dorset Regiment in front. As soon as they advanced they came under heavy fire, but they got close to the village of Damery with the help of two tanks that went through the village twice. The attack was then halted to avoid heavier casualties. The brigade was in reserve for 32nd Division's attack on 23 August.

On 28 August during the Battle of the Scarpe 14th Bde attacked at 05.00 and advanced unopposed towards its first two objectives: 5th/6th RS's advance was described as 'a procession', and by the end of the day the brigade had observation over the Somme Valley. Soon after dawn the next day they had pushed right up to the river. 5th/6th Royal Scots was then pulled out of the line, but it returned to cross the Somme Canal and river on 5 September. At 10.30 one company waded across at the site of Brie bridge, despite machine gun fire; it then cleared Brie, bombing the dugouts, while a second company crossed by a temporary footbridge. The two companies then established a line 1,000 yards (910 m) beyond the village, and the division passed through later in the day.

There was then another rest until the Battle of St Quentin Canal began on 29 September. Facing the most formidable part of the Hindenburg Line on the St Quentin Canal, 5th/6th RS did not go into action until 1 October, once the line had been breached. At 16.00 they were directed against the key position in the German second line, the village of Sequehart, just north of St Quentin. The village changed hands four times until on 3 October the battalion, which had specifically asked for another chance to take the village, succeeded in holding it, despite heavy shelling and two more counter-attacks.

By early November the army had closed up to the Sambre–Oise Canal. The Battle of the Sambre opened on 4 November. Two platoons of 5th/6th RS were given the task of attacking le Donjon two minutes after Zero Hour behind special barrage, and if possible to obtain a crossing over the canal. Finding themselves unable to follow the assigned path through the marsh, the two platoons the half the battalion followed the 1st Dorsets across a floating bridge; le Donjon fell at 10.45. At 13.30 the 5th/6th RS and 1st Dorsets advanced to establish the bridgehead defences: the opposition was so negligible that no barrage was required.

The advance continued, with the division capturing Grand-Fayt on 6 November and Avesnes on 8 November, which it was occupying on 11 November when the Armistice came into force. 32nd Division was chosen as part of the occupation force (the British Army of the Rhine) and advanced to the Meuse between Dinant and Namur, where it became the reserve to the army in Germany. On 3 February 1919 the division took over the southern sector of the Cologne bridgehead. In March 5th/6th Royal Scots joined 2nd Lowland Brigade in the Lowland Division (formed from 9th (Scottish) Division). The division was disbanded in October, and 5th/6th Royal Scots was demobilised on 12 November 1919.

=== 2/4th and 2/5th (QER) Royal Scots ===
After formation in September 1914 2/4th (QER) Bn went to Penicuik in February 1915 and both transferred from 2nd Lothian Bde to 1st Lothian Bde at Peebles to replace their 1st Line battalions. They left in October and November 1915 to join 195th Bde in 65th (2nd Lowland) Division. In November 1915 the infantry battalions in the 64th (2nd Highland) and 65th (2nd Lowland) Divisions were reorganised and numbered sequentially, the 2/4th, 2/5th and 2/6th Royal Scots temporarily combining as No 19 Battalion; by May 1916 they had reverted to their previous regimental designations, but 2/5th remained merged with 2/4th.

195th Brigade was stationed at Dunfermline during the winter of 1915–16. In March 1916, 65th (2nd L) Division moved into England and joined Southern Army (Home Forces), 195th Bde being quartered in Essex around Billericay and then from July at Terling. In January 1917 the division moved to Ireland to relieve 59th (2nd North Midland) Division, which had been the first TF formation to serve in that country. 2/4th Battalion was stationed at Fermoy.

During 1917 the 2nd Line TF battalions in 65th (2nd Lowland) Division were progressively replaced by Graduated Battalions of the Training Reserve; in August 1917 the 2/4th Royal Scots was disbanded and was replaced by 217th Graduated Bn.

=== 3/4th and 3/5th Royal Scots ===
The 3rd Line battalions of the Queen's Edinburgh Rifles were formed as training units at Peebles in May 1915 and moved to Loanhead and Galashiels respectively in November. They were designated as the 4th and 5th Reserve Bns, Royal Scots, on 8 April 1916 and were at Stobs Military Camp in May. On 1 September 1916, while it was at Catterick Camp in North Yorkshire, the 4th Reserve Bn absorbed the 5th, 6th, 7th and 8th Reserve Bns and became part of the Lowland Reserve Brigade. It also absorbed the 9th (Highland) Reserve Bn in June 1917. The combined battalion moved back to Edinburgh, in the Edinburgh Special Reserve Brigade, in November 1917, then to Haddington in April 1918, and was at Cupar in the Forth Garrison at the end of the war. It was disbanded on 28 June 1919 in Glasgow.

=== 6th Scottish Provisional Battalion ===
In 1915 the Home Service men of the 4th, 5th and 6th Royal Scots were combined into 6th Scottish Provisional Battalion, which joined the Lothian Brigade (redesignated the Scottish Provisional Brigade and later 1st Provisional Brigade) on 22 May. In April 1916 the 1st Provisional Bde moved from Scotland to Kent to take over coastal defence duties. The Military Service Act 1916 swept away the Home/Foreign service distinction, and all TF soldiers became liable for overseas service, if medically fit, and the remaining provisional battalions were reorganised, but the 6th Provisional Bn had already been disbanded and its men dispersed.

== Interwar ==
90 cm 'Projector Anti-Aircraft', displayed at Fort Nelson, Hampshire.

The TF was reconstituted on 7 February 1920 and the 52nd (Lowland) Division and its units began to reform. The 4th and 5th (QER) Battalions did guard duty during the coal strike of April 1921. After the TF was reorganised as the Territorial Army (TA), the two battalions reformed in 1921 as a single 4th/5th (Queen's Edinburgh Rifles) Bn, Royal Scots, and absorbed 10th (Cyclist) Bn, Royal Scots at Linlithgow as A Company. The combined battalion formed part of 155th (East Scottish) Bde in 52nd (L) Division.

=== AA Conversion ===
During the 1930s the increasing need for anti-aircraft (AA) defence for Britain's cities was addressed by converting a number of TA infantry battalions into AA units. The 4th/5th (QER) Royal Scots was one of the battalions selected, becoming a Royal Artillery searchlight (S/L) regiment on 1 November 1938 while remaining affiliated with the Royal Scots. It was designated 4th/5th (Queen's Edinburgh) Bn The Royal Scots (The Royal Regiment) (52nd Searchlight Regiment) and consisted of HQ, 405, 406, 407 Companies based at Forrest Road. At the same time, the TA was doubled in size following the Munich Crisis, so A Company at Linlithgow was separated to become the basis for 14th (West Lothian Royal Scots) Light AA Regiment, RA.

== World War II ==
=== 52nd (Queen's Edinburgh, Royal Scots) Searchlight Regiment ===
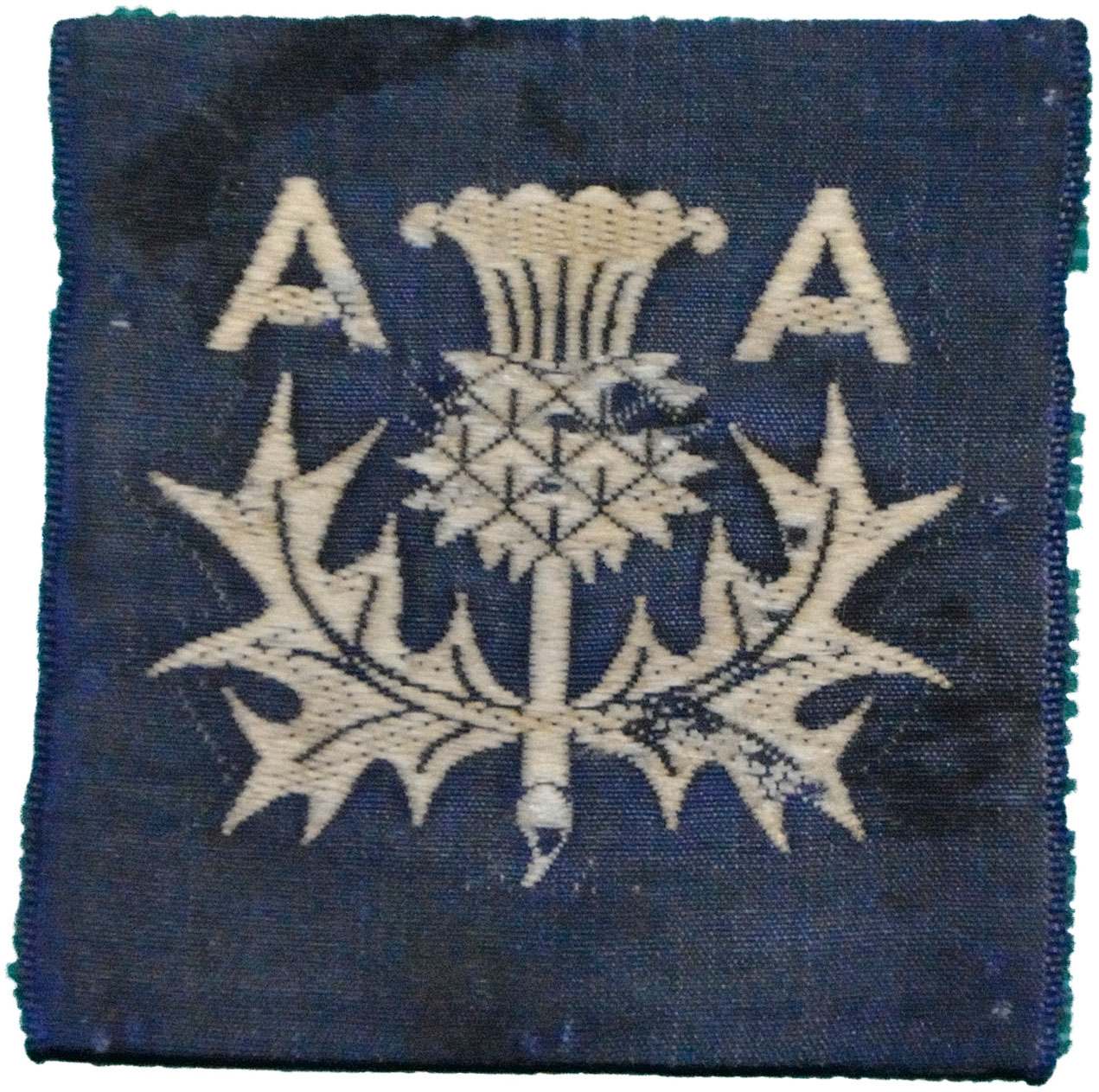
3 AA Divisional sign.

The regiment formed part of 3 AA Division covering Scotland. In February 1939 the existing AA defences came under the control of a new Anti-Aircraft Command. In June a partial mobilisation of TA units was begun in a process known as 'couverture', whereby each AA unit did a month's tour of duty in rotation to man selected AA and searchlight positions. On 24 August, ahead of the declaration of war, AA Command was fully mobilised at its war stations. 4th/5th Royal Scots (52nd S/L Rgt) became part of 52nd Light Anti-Aircraft Brigade, which was formed in August 1939 with responsibility for all of 3 AA Division's S/L provision.

As part of the Forth defences, 52nd Searchlight Regiment was engaged in the first air raid against the UK during World War II, when German aircraft attacked the Royal Naval Dockyard at Rosyth near the Forth Bridge on 16 October 1939. During the Phoney War period there were a number of other attacks on the naval bases of Scotland before the Luftwaffe turned its attention to the campaigns in Norway and France and the Low Countries.

In February 1940 the regiment sent a cadre of 5 officers and 27 ORs to 222nd Searchlight Training Regiment, RA, at Norton Manor Barracks near Taunton, where, with a similar cadre from 51st (Highland) Anti-Aircraft Battalion, Royal Engineers, they formed a new 474th Searchlight Battery, Royal Artillery, from new conscripts and volunteers. This independent battery served with AA Command and later provided artificial illumination, or 'Monty's Moonlight', for night operations by 21st Army Group during the campaign in North West Europe in 1944–45.

In August 1940 the RA took over all the S/L regiments in AA Command, after which the regiment was designated 52nd (Queen's Edinburgh, Royal Scots) Searchlight Regiment, RA, and the companies were termed batteries.

Eastern Scotland largely escaped air attack during the Battle of Britain. In November 1940, at the height of The Blitz, a new 12 AA Division was formed to take over responsibility for western Scotland (including Glasgow and the Clyde) while 3 AA Division (including 52 LAA Bde and 52nd S/L Rgt) retained responsibility for eastern Scotland. The regiment remained in 52 AA Bde and 3 AA Division for the next year.moving to positions in the Scottish Borders.

The regiment supplied another cadre of experienced officers and men to 237th S/L Training Rgt at Holywood, County Down, where it provided the basis for a new 535 S/L Bty formed on 14 November 1940. This battery later joined 56th (5th Battalion, Cameronian Scottish Rifles) S/L Rgt. On 11 February 1941 52nd S/L Rgt was joined by 531 S/L Bty formed on 14 November at 235th S/L Training Rgt at Ayr from a cadre provided by 56th S/L Rgt. By December 1941, 408 S/L Bty had transferred to 53rd S/L Rgt (5th Bn Royal Northumberland Fusiliers)

=== 130th (Queen's Edinburgh, Royal Scots) Light Anti-Aircraft Regiment ===
By 1942, AA Command had more than enough S/L units, but was still seriously short of light anti-aircraft (LAA) gun units, and began a programme of converting S/L units (which also had the benefit of saving manpower). In March 52nd S/L Rgt was converted to the LAA role as 130th (Queen's Edinburgh, Royal Scots) LAA Rgt, the batteries becoming 406, 407 and 426 LAA Btys. After training it remained in 52 AA Bde in 3 AA Division, stationed in Aberdeenshire.

In August 1942, 3 AA Divisional HQ moved south to help control the AA units brought in to defend against Luftwaffe 'hit and run' attacks on the South Coast of England. Simultaneously, 52 AA Bde HQ left AA Command to mobilise for the landings in North Africa (Operation Torch). 130th LAA Regiment moved to 51 AA Bde in a new 6 AA Group that took over responsibility for Scotland in October. By now the regiment had been joined by 446 LAA Bty, transferred from 95th LAA Rgt.

The regiment moved to 67 AA Bde in 3 AA Group in Dorset in April 1943, and then to 2 AA Group in South East England, first in 5 AA Bde, then to 71 AA Bde.

==== Operation Diver ====
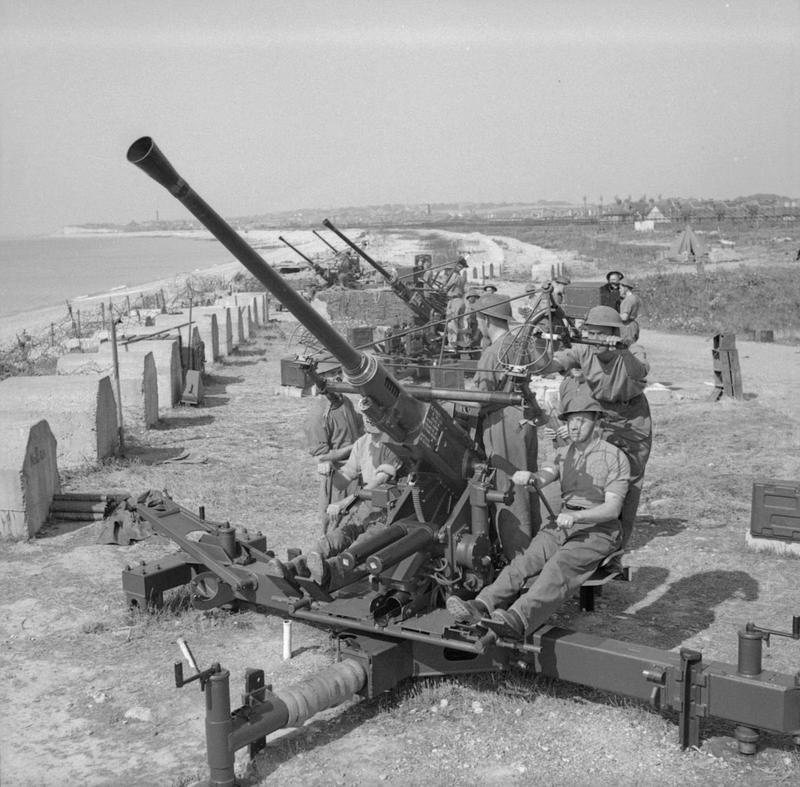

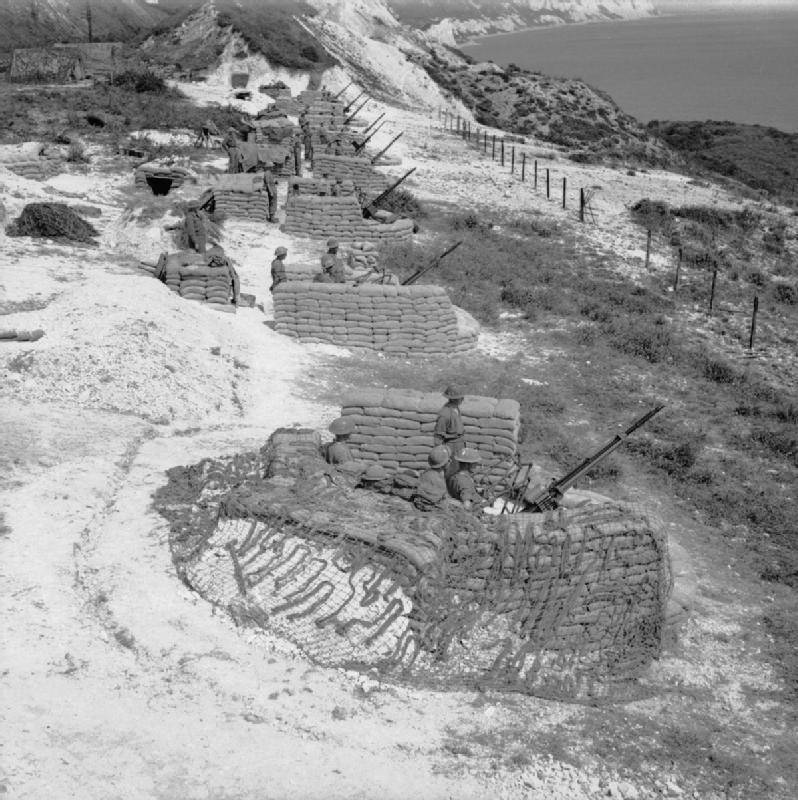
LAA guns emplaced on the South Coast, August 1944.

130th LAA Regiment was stationed on the Kent coast, in the so-called 'Hellfire Corner' where Cross-Channel shelling from German guns was frequent. In November 1943 2 AA Gp was ordered to plan for the expected onslaught of V-1 flying bombs (codenamed 'Divers') against London, to which it responded by planning a thick belt of Heavy AA (HAA) gun positions across the likely flight path, backed by LAA guns. Meanwhile, 2 AA Gp also had to deal with a sharp increase in Luftwaffe air raids trying to reach London during the winter of 1943–1944 (the so-called 'Little Blitz'), in which the regiment was heavily engaged. However, AA Command was being forced to release manpower for overseas service, particularly the Allied invasion of Normandy, Operation Overlord, and many AA regiments lost one of their four batteries; by March 1944, 446 LAA Bty had been disbanded.

Once 'Overlord' began on 6 June (D-Day) the shelling of Hellfire Corner increased in intensity. The first V-1 missiles were launched against London a week after D-Day, and Operation Diver was activated. 2 AA Group's batteries left their 'Overlord' sites and moved to pre-planned sites across the 'funnel' of V-1 flightpaths. However, the results were disappointing, and the HAA gun belt was moved to the coast and interlaced with LAA guns to hit the missiles out to sea. This new belt was divided into six brigade sectors, with 71 AA Bde taking charge of one. The guns were constantly in action and their success rate against the 'Divers' steadily improved, until over 50 per cent of incoming missiles were destroyed by gunfire or fighter aircraft. This phase of Operation Diver ended in September after the V-1 launch sites in Northern France had been overrun by 21st Army Group.

A new phase of Operation Diver began when the Luftwaffe began launching V-1s from aircraft over the North Sea. AA Command had to reorganise its defences, stripping guns from existing sites and moving them to the coast of East Anglia, which entailed enormous reorganisation. As the Luftwaffe and V-1 threat to the UK diminished, AA Command was forced to transfer men and units to infantry duties. 130th LAA Regiment avoided all the shuffling and disbandments, remaining with 71 AA Bde in 2 AA Gp throughout the Diver offensive and until the end of the war. After the war it transferred to 28 (Thames and Medway) AA Bde in 1 AA Gp as demobilisation proceeded.

== Postwar ==
When the TA was reconstituted on 1 January 1947, the regiment reformed at Edinburgh as 587 (Queen's Edinburgh, Royal Scots) LAA Rgt. It formed part of 62 AA Bde (the former 36 (Scottish) AA Bde).

When AA Command was disbanded on 10 March 1955 there was a major reduction in the number of AA units in the TA. 587 LAA Rgt amalgamated with R Bty of 471 (Forth) HAA Rgt, 514 (West Lothian, Royal Scots) LAA Rgt and 519 (Dunedin) LAA Rgt to form a new 432 LAA Rgt with the following organisation:

- P (Queens Edinburgh, Royal Scots) Bty – from 587 LAA
- Q (West Lothian, Royal Scots) Bty – from 514 LAA
- R (City of Edinburgh) Bty – from 471 HAA
- S (Dunedin) Bty – from 519 LAA

A further reduction in 1961 saw 432nd LAA Rgt transferred to the Royal Engineers (RE) and joined with 585 (Edinburgh) and 586 Independent Field Squadrons, to form 432 (City of Edinburgh) Corps Engineer Regiment (except Q (West Lothian, Royal Scots) Bty, which joined 445 (Cameronians) LAA Rgt). When the TA was converted into the TAVR in 1967, 432 Engineer Regiment was reduced to a single 104 (City of Edinburgh) Field Squadron in 71 (Scottish) Engineer Regiment. It was disbanded in 1999.

== Uniform, insignia and bands ==
The original uniform worn by the Queen's Edinburgh Rifles was a long tunic and trousers in dark Volunteer grey with black braiding and a low black-peaked cap. The three original Highland companies wore black-laced grey doublets and kilts of Black Watch ('Government') tartan with different bonnets for each of the three companies. Each of the original 21 QER companies had a different cap badge. The cut of the tunic was later changed to match that of the Rifle Brigade, and the original low peaked cap was replaced first (1862) by a Shako with a black ball-tuft, next (1875) by a Busby with black plume and then (1895) by a black Astrakhan fur busby matching the Rifle Brigade. In 1900–1901 the brigade adopted a drab felt hat; this was prohibited in 1902 but a drab service dress with light green Austrian knot and trouser piping was adopted for marching and drill order, with a drab felt hat (with black plume for the mounted infantry). The grey uniform was retained for full dress until 1908 when the battalions adopted the scarlet uniform tunic with blue facings of the Royal Scots. The regimental tartan was Hunting Stuart, while the pipers wore Royal Stewart tartan.

In 1943, 130th LAA Rgt adopted as its regimental flash a silhouette of the Royal Scots' other ranks' cap badge in black cloth, the colour commemorating the black braiding of the QER. In 1947, 587th LAA Rgt adopted a black silhouette of a Thistle head on a brown square; this was officially approved as its regimental flash on 9 November 1951 and worn until 1955.

The 1st City of Edinburgh RVC formed a band early in its history, adopting the regimental march of the Rifle Brigade, I'm Ninety-Five. The early QER Highland companies each had two pipers, and the corps also had a bugle band.

== Honorary Colonels ==
From the formation of the 1st QERVB the Lord Provost of Edinburgh served ex officio as its Honorary Colonel. From 1873 additional honorary colonels were added:

- James Moncreiff, 1st Baron Moncreiff, lt-col commandant 1859–73, appointed 17 May 1873
- D. Davidson, CB, lt-col commandant 1873–82, appointed 28 June 1882
- Gen Viscount Wolseley, Adjutant-General to the Forces and future Commander-in-Chief of the British Army, appointed 24 April 1889
- John Macdonald, Lord Kingsburgh, VD, lt-col commandant 1882–92, appointed (to 5th Bn Royal Scots) 5 June 1901

== Memorials ==
All Royal Scots who died in World War I are commemorated by the memorial gates unveiled at the regimental depot, Glencorse Barracks, Penicuik, in 1927. These were designed by J.A. McWilliam, a member of the QER.

The 4th/5th Battalion's colours from 1925 to 1938 are preserved in the Royal Scots Regimental Museum at Edinburgh Castle.

A memorial Masonic Lodge, Queen's Edinburgh Rifles (The Royal Scots) No 1253, was established on 3 February 1921, under the Grand Lodge of Scotland, to commemorate those members who died in World War I. A lodge room was established in 1925 at the Forrest Road drill hall which also served as a Territorial Army headquarters and as a building for the University of Edinburgh Officer Training Corps. The Lodge now meets in Portobello but maintains its role as a memorial lodge.
