= James McPhie =

Scottish soldier and Recipient of the Victoria Cross

- Born: 18 December 1894; Edinburgh, Scotland
- Died: 14 October 1918 (aged 23); Sensée Canal, near Aubencheul-au-Bac, France
- Burial place: Naves Communal Cemetery Extension
- Military career
- Allegiance: United Kingdom
- Branch: British Army
- Service years: 1914 - 1918
- Rank: Corporal
- Units: Royal Engineers
- Conflicts: World War I
- Awards: Victoria Cross

James McPhie VC (18 December 1894 – 14 October 1918) was a Scottish recipient of the Victoria Cross, the highest and most prestigious award for gallantry in the face of the enemy that can be awarded to British and Commonwealth forces.

== Details ==
McPhie was 23 years old, and a corporal in the 416th (Edinburgh) Field Company, Royal Engineers, British Army, during the First World War when the following deed took place for which he was awarded the VC.

On 14 October 1918 at the Canal de la Sensée near Aubencheul-au-Bac, Nord, France, Corporal McPhie was with a party of sappers maintaining a cork float bridge, which when our infantry started to cross it just before dawn began to break away and sink. Corporal McPhie jumped into the water and tried to hold the cork and timbers together but this proved impossible so he swam back and collected the materials for repair. Although it was daylight and the bridge was under close fire he then led the way to the bridge, axe in hand. He was severely wounded and died almost at once. However, the bridge was kept open and 1/2nd Battalion, London Regiment were able to maintain their bridgehead on the opposite bank until relieved.

His grave is at Naves, about 6 km east of Cambrai.

He was commemorated on the war memorial doorway in St George's Church, Charlotte Square, Edinburgh, and, when the church was closed and the memorial demolished, on a plaque in St Andrew's & St George's West Church. He is also commemorated by a bench in West Princes Street Gardens under the Royal Scots Grey statue, there is also a memorial stone at the corner of Brown St. Edinburgh].

== The medal ==
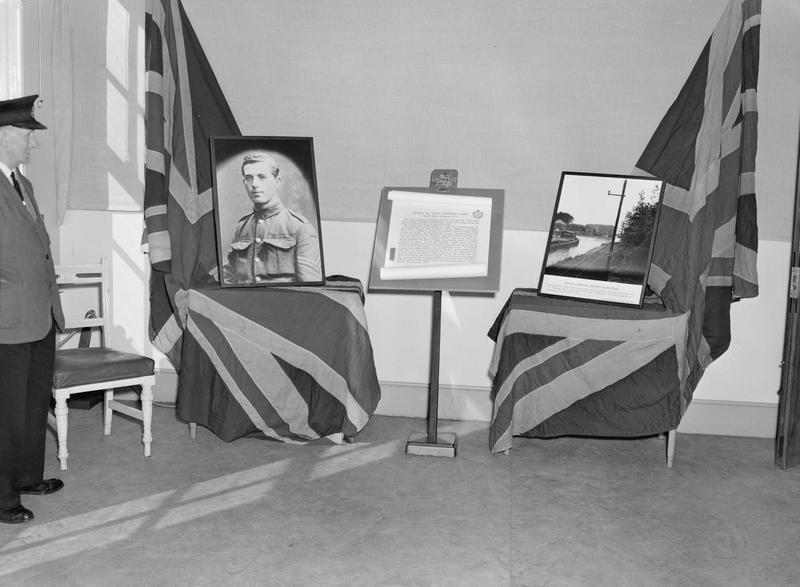
Presentation of Cpl James McPhie's VC to the Imperial War Museum by his brother John B. McPhie, 27 September 1963.

His Victoria Cross is displayed at the Imperial War Museum, London, England.
