= Forth Brigade =

- Active: 1888–1902
- Country: United Kingdom
- Branch: Volunteer Force
- Type: Infantry
- Size: Brigade
- Garrison/HQ: Edinburgh

Commanders
- Notable commanders: Colonel John Macdonald, Lord Kingsburgh

The Forth Brigade was a Scottish infantry formation of Britain's Volunteer Force from 1888 to 1902.

== Origins ==
The enthusiasm for the Volunteer movement following an invasion scare in 1859 saw the creation of many Rifle Volunteer units composed of part-time soldiers eager to supplement the Regular British Army in time of need. The Stanhope Memorandum of 1888 proposed a comprehensive Mobilisation Scheme for Volunteer units, which would assemble in their own brigades at key points in case of war. In peacetime these brigades provided a structure for collective training. Under this scheme a number of Volunteer Battalions in South East Scotland would assemble together at Edinburgh as the Forth Brigade.

The brigade headquarters was at 51 Hanover Street, Edinburgh, later at Surgeons' Hall in the city. Its first commander, appointed on 15 September 1888, was Colonel J.H.A. Macdonald (later Lord Kingsburgh, Lord Advocate of Scotland), who was Lieutenant-Colonel Commandant of the Queen's Rifle Volunteer Brigade, Royal Scots. He was one of the leading Volunteer advocates of drill reform, author of On the Best Detail Formation for the New Infantry Tactics (1873) and Commonsense on Parade or Drill without Strings (1886).

== Organisation ==
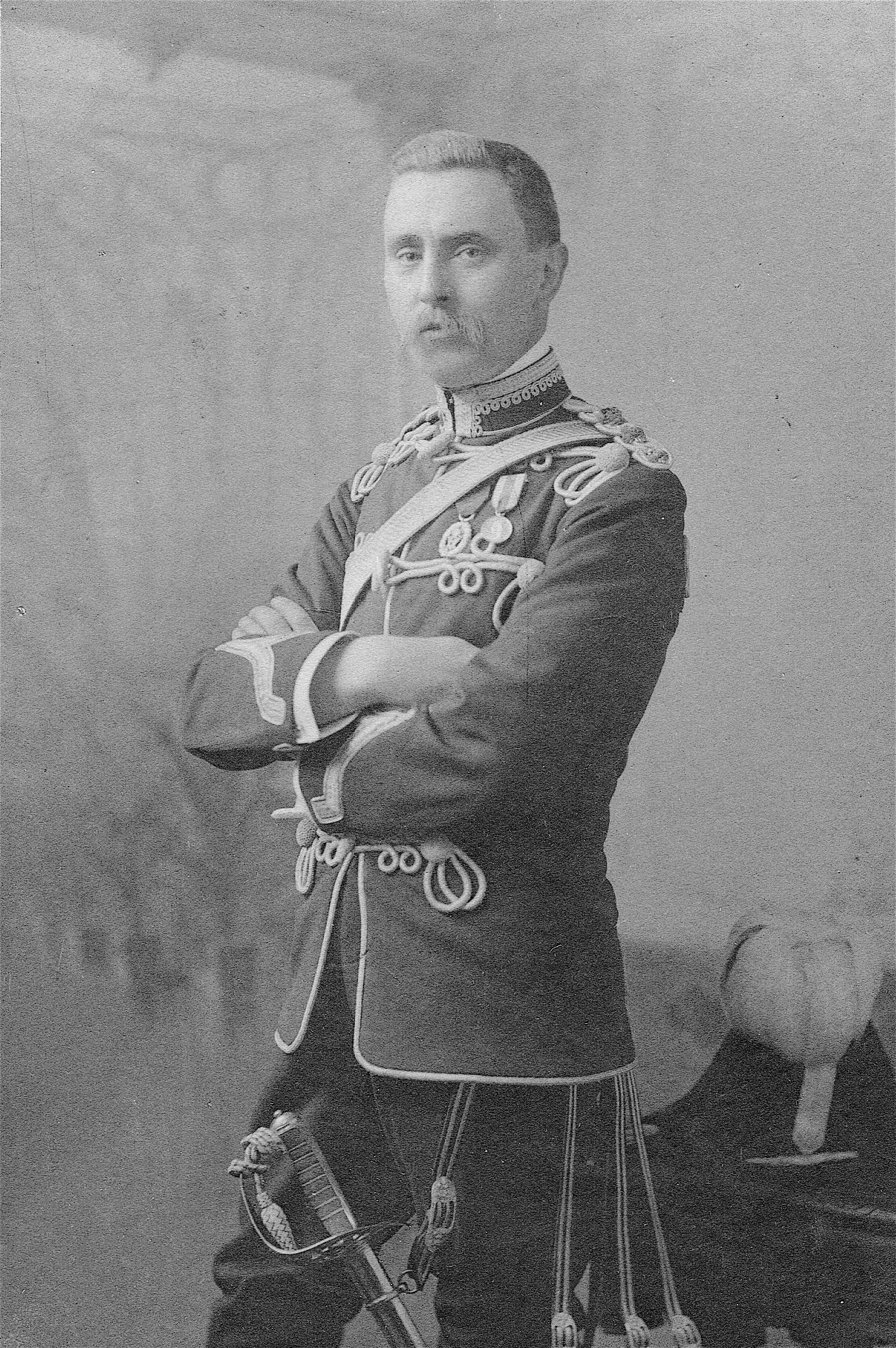
Lt-Col W.I. Macadam, Brigade major of the Forth Brigade

From 1888 the Forth Brigade had the following composition:

- Queen's Rifle Volunteer Brigade, Royal Scots (3 Battalions) at Edinburgh
- 4th Volunteer Battalion, Royal Scots at Edinburgh
- 5th Volunteer Battalion, Royal Scots at Leith
- 6th Volunteer Battalion, Royal Scots at Penicuik
- 7th Volunteer Battalion, Royal Scots at Haddington
- 8th Volunteer Battalion, Royal Scots at Linlithgow
- 4th (Perthshire) Volunteer Battalion, Black Watch (Royal Highlanders) at Perth
- 6th (Fifeshire) Volunteer Battalion, Black Watch at St Andrews
- 4th (Stirlingshire) Volunteer Battalion, Argyll and Sutherland Highlanders at Stirling
- 7th (Clackmannan and Kinross) Volunteer Battalion, Argyll and Sutherland Highlanders at Alloa
- Supply Detachment, Army Service Corps
- Bearer Company, Army Hospital Corps (later Royal Army Medical Corps)

The Brigade major in the 1890s was Lt-Col Robert Cranston of the QRVB, later Lt-Col W.I. Macadam of the 5th VB, Royal Scots.

With a total of 12 battalions this brigade was larger than most VIBs and in the early 1890s the 6th and 7th Bns Royal Scots were split off to join the Scottish Border Brigade, and the Black Watch and Argyll & Sutherland Highlanders joined the Tay Brigade.

== Disbandment ==
The Volunteer Infantry Brigades were reorganised in 1902 and the Forth Brigade was split into the 1st and 2nd Lothian Brigades, with the 1st Brigade based at the QRVB's Forrest Hill drill hall, (for a while at 28 Rutland Street, Edinburgh), and 2nd Brigade at 21 Bernard Street, Leith, later at Castle Douglas. Col Cranston later took command of 1st Lothian Brigade.

1st Lothian Brigade

- Queen's Rifle Volunteer Brigade, Royal Scots (3 Battalions)
- 4th Volunteer Battalion, Royal Scots
- 9th (Highland) Volunteer Battalion, Royal Scots
- Army Service Corps Company
- 1st Lothian Bearer Company, Royal Army Medical Corps (Vols)

2nd Lothian Brigade

- 5th Volunteer Battalion, Royal Scots
- 6th Volunteer Battalion, Royal Scots
- 7th Volunteer Battalion, Royal Scots
- 8th Volunteer Battalion, Royal Scots
- Army Service Corps Company
- Bearer Company, Royal Army Medical Corps

After the Volunteers were subsumed into the Territorial Force under the Haldane Reforms in 1908, 1st Lothian Brigade became simply the Lothian Brigade in Scottish Coastal Defences
