= Robert Cranston (Scottish politician) =

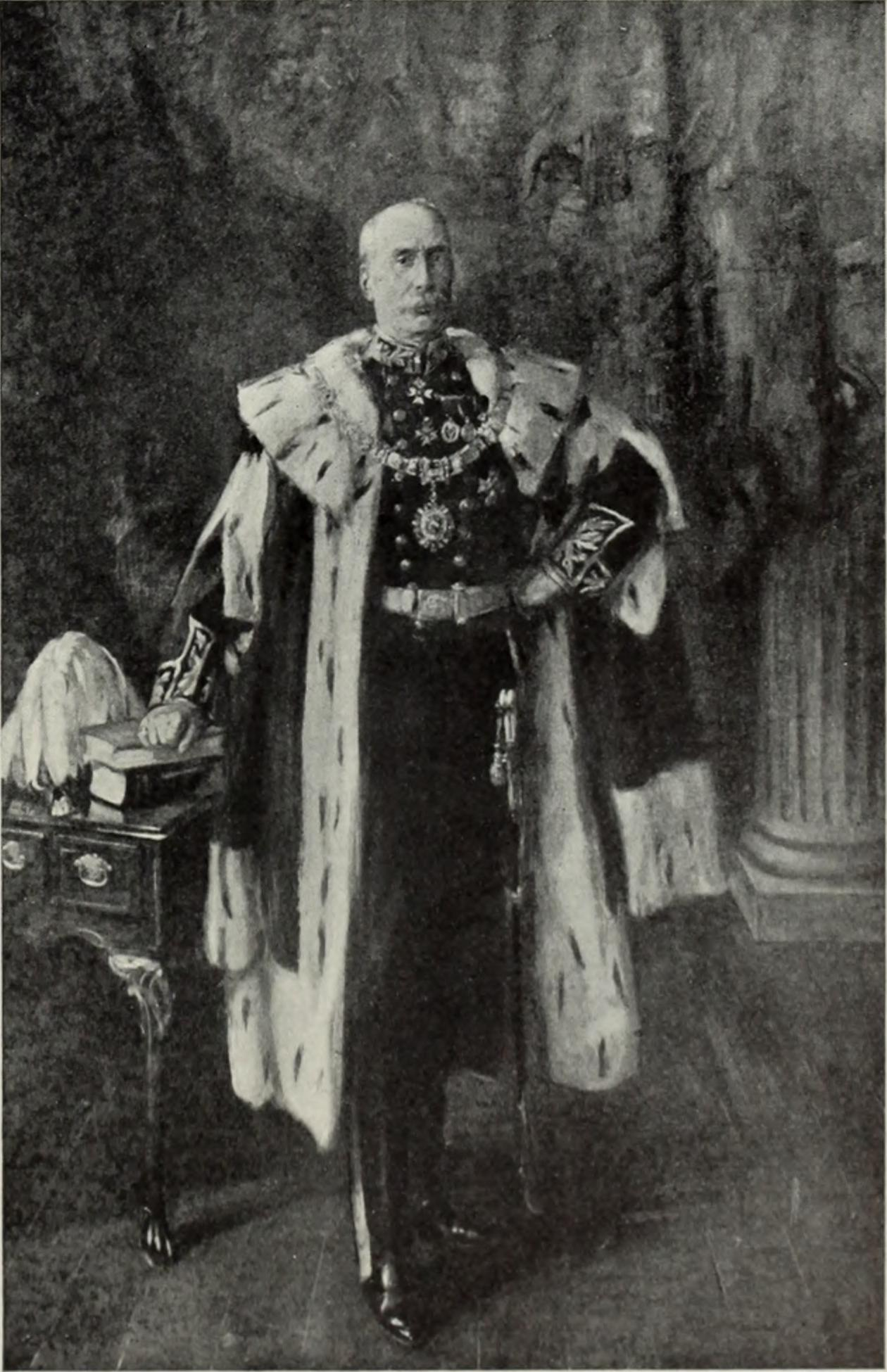
Sir Robert Cranston by Alexander Ignatius Roche

Brigadier-General Sir Robert Cranston KCVO CB CBE VD DL FEIS FRSSA (2 June 1843 – 22 October 1923) was a Scottish military officer who served as Lord Provost of Edinburgh from 1903 to 1906. He had an illustrious military career largely with the Volunteer Force.

In 1914, he set up the first Edinburgh Pals battalion; the 15th battalion Royal Scots (also known as the Manchester-Scottish owing to its high ratio of members from the Manchester area). This was quickly followed by two further volunteer battalions; the 16th and 17th. Sir Robert was honorary commander in chief of all three battalions.

== Life ==
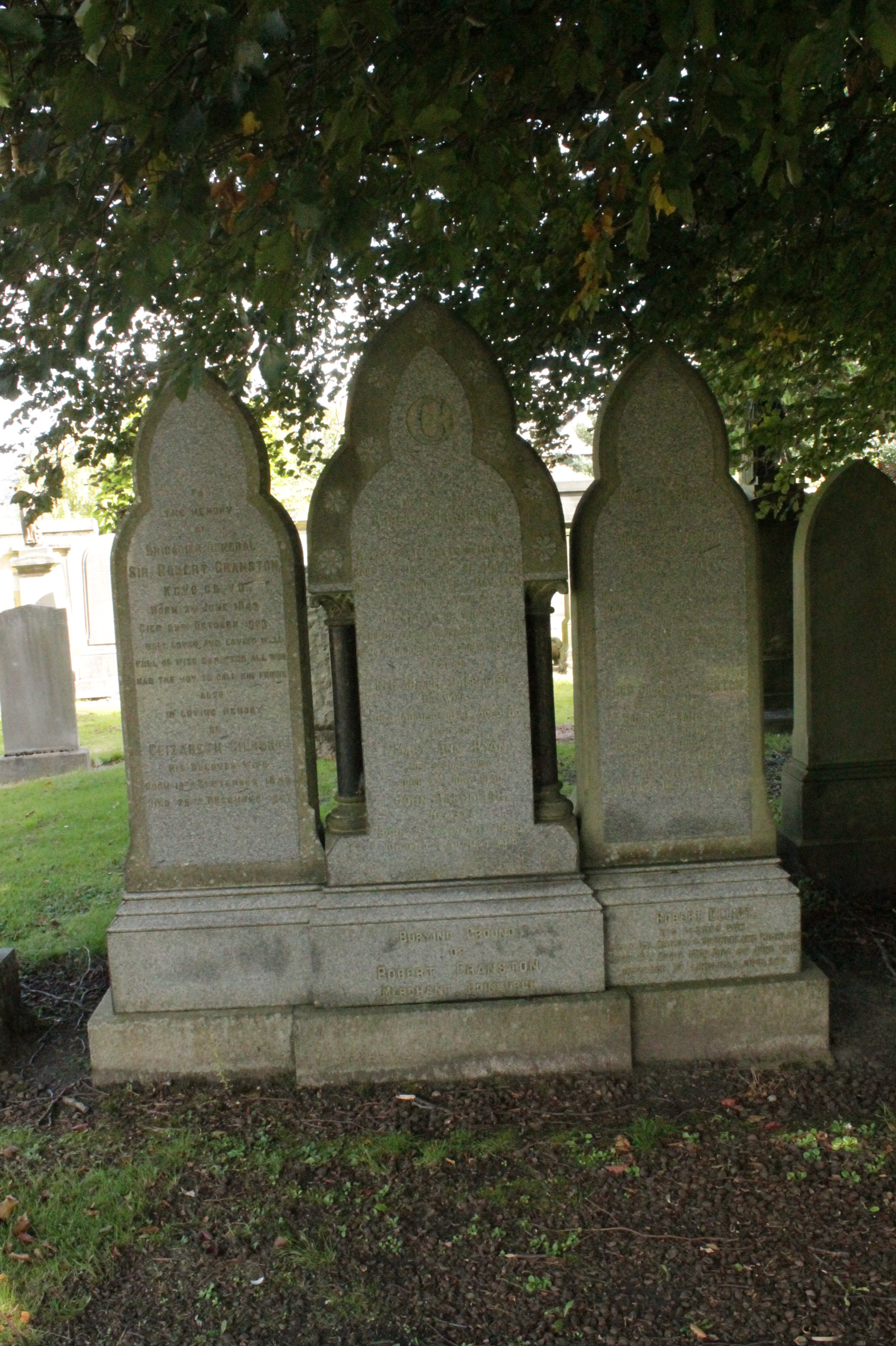
The restored grave of Sir Robert Cranston, Grange Cemetery

Robert was born in Edinburgh, the son of Bailie Robert Cranston (1815–1892), a pioneer of total abstinence in the early 19th century, and his first wife, Elizabeth Dalgleish. A younger sister, Mary Cranston Mason (1846-1932), became a social worker and temperance leader.

Robert was educated at the Royal High School on Regent Road. He did not attend university but was awarded an honorary doctorate (LLD) from the University of Philadelphia in later life. He trained in business in London and Paris.

He was awarded the freedom of the city of Edinburgh on 15 October 1923, shortly before his death.

He died at home at 19 Merchiston Avenue, Edinburgh following a brief illness and was buried with full military honours in the Grange Cemetery following a service in St. Giles Cathedral. The grave lies on the main eastern path. It was restored in 2020.

== Career ==
=== Business career ===
Originally Cranston worked in the drapery department of Kennington & Jenner (a forerunner of Jenners department store. Thereafter he set up a joint private business, Cranston & Elliot on North Bridge, but this had to be relocated due to acquisition by the North British Railway Company to build the North British Hotel (now the Balmoral). His company then moved to Princes Street. He also was concurrently managing director of Cranston’s Hotels Ltd.

=== Political career ===
Cranston was a member of the Unionist party. Cranston entered Edinburgh Town Council in 1882 as councillor for the George Square ward in Edinburgh’s South Side. In 1900 he was appointed Treasurer of the Council leading in November 1903 to his being elected Lord Provost of the city, a role which he served for three years. In this same period he served as Honorary President of George Heriots Former Pupils Golf Club.

In November 1909 he was appointed as the Unionist candidate for Leith district but was unsuccessful in the 1910 election, losing to Viscount Novar (then Mr R.C.Munro-Ferguson).

=== Military career ===
Cranston had long links to the Volunteer Force and the Territorial Force, stretching over 40 years.

He had first joined the Volunteers in 1860 in the 19th Middlesex Rifle Volunteer Corps, then after briefly joining the Scots Guards during the Trent Affair he joined the 1st Midlothian Artillery Volunteers as a gunner in 1864. He was commissioned as an Ensign in the 1st Queen's Edinburgh Rifle Volunteer Brigade (QERVB) on 11 February 1870, rising to Captain (1 December 1875), Major (25 April 1885) and Lieutenant-Colonel in command of its 2nd Battalion (9 April 1892). He was also Brigade major of the Forth Brigade (which included the QERVB) in the 1890s.

At this time he came to the notice of the military authorities as he had no formal military training as an officer. He was consequently sent to Aldershot where he studied as part of Major General Carr Glyn’s Brigade, serving under Major Hammersley. On completion he received a complimentary certificate from the commanding General. In 1896 he served under the Duke of Connaught during "Volunteer Week".

He served as the QERVB's Lt-Col Commandant from 1903 to 1906. As Lord Provost of Edinburgh he was also ex officio the brigade's Honorary Colonel. In 1904 he assembled a huge crowd of volunteers of the 1st Lothian Brigade (successor to the Forth Brigade) in Holyrood Park, and from 1 June 1906 he served as Colonel commanding this brigade. In 1905, he participated in meetings with H. O. Arnold-Forster, Secretary of State for War, over the future of the Volunteer Force, and in 1908 he represented Scotland on the Advisory Committee on the establishment of the Territorial Force.

In August 1914 he established the first Edinburgh Pals battalion: the 15th Royal Scots. In 1915 he was on active service in France (whilst the 15th were still training).

=== Honours ===
- 1904: Officer of the Legion of Honour awarded by French authorities
- 1905: Knighted by King Edward VII a Knight Commander of the Royal Victorian Order (KCVO)
- 1905: Created a Knight of St. Olaf (as far as is known he was the only Scottish recipient of the Knight of St.Olaf, awarded by the Norwegian government.
- 1909: Companion of The Most Honourable Order of the Bath (CB)
- 1918: Commander of the Most Excellent Order of the British Empire (CBE)

A large portrait of Sir Robert hangs in Edinburgh City Chambers, painted by Alexander Ignatius Roche (one of the Glasgow Boys).

=== Other achievements ===
- Deputy Lieutenant of the County and City of Edinburgh.
- Co-founder and Life Governor of the Queen Victoria School for Orphans of Soldiers and Sailors in Dunblane.
- Fellow of the Educational Institute of Scotland.
- Fellow of the Royal Scottish Society of the Arts (RSSA)
