= City of Edinburgh (Fortress) Royal Engineers =

- Active: 1886–1999
- Country: United Kingdom
- Branch: Territorial Army (United Kingdom)
- Role: Coast Defence; Field Engineering
- Garrison/HQ: Edinburgh
- Engagements: World War I: Somme; Arras; Langemarck; Cambrai; German spring offensive; Hundred Days Offensive; World War II: Tunisia; Italy

The City of Edinburgh (Fortress) Royal Engineers was a volunteer unit of the British Army under various titles from 1886 until 1999. Its main role was defence of the Firth of Forth, but it also provided detachments for active service in the field during both World Wars.

== Submarine miners ==
Lieutenant-General Sir Andrew Clarke, Inspector-General of Fortifications 1882–6, did not have enough Regular Royal Engineers (RE) to man the fixed mines being installed to defend British ports. He decided to utilise the Volunteer Engineers for this task, and after successful trials the system was rolled out to ports around the country. The Forth Division Submarine Miners was the fifth unit of Volunteer Submarine Miners, a new corps raised in 1886. The first officers' commissions were issued on 2 April 1887 and by the end of the century the unit was a major's command, with three companies. Initially, the headquarters was aboard the mine depot ship HMS Dido at Leith, the port of Edinburgh, but moved to Queen Street, Edinburgh, in 1905.

== Territorial Force ==
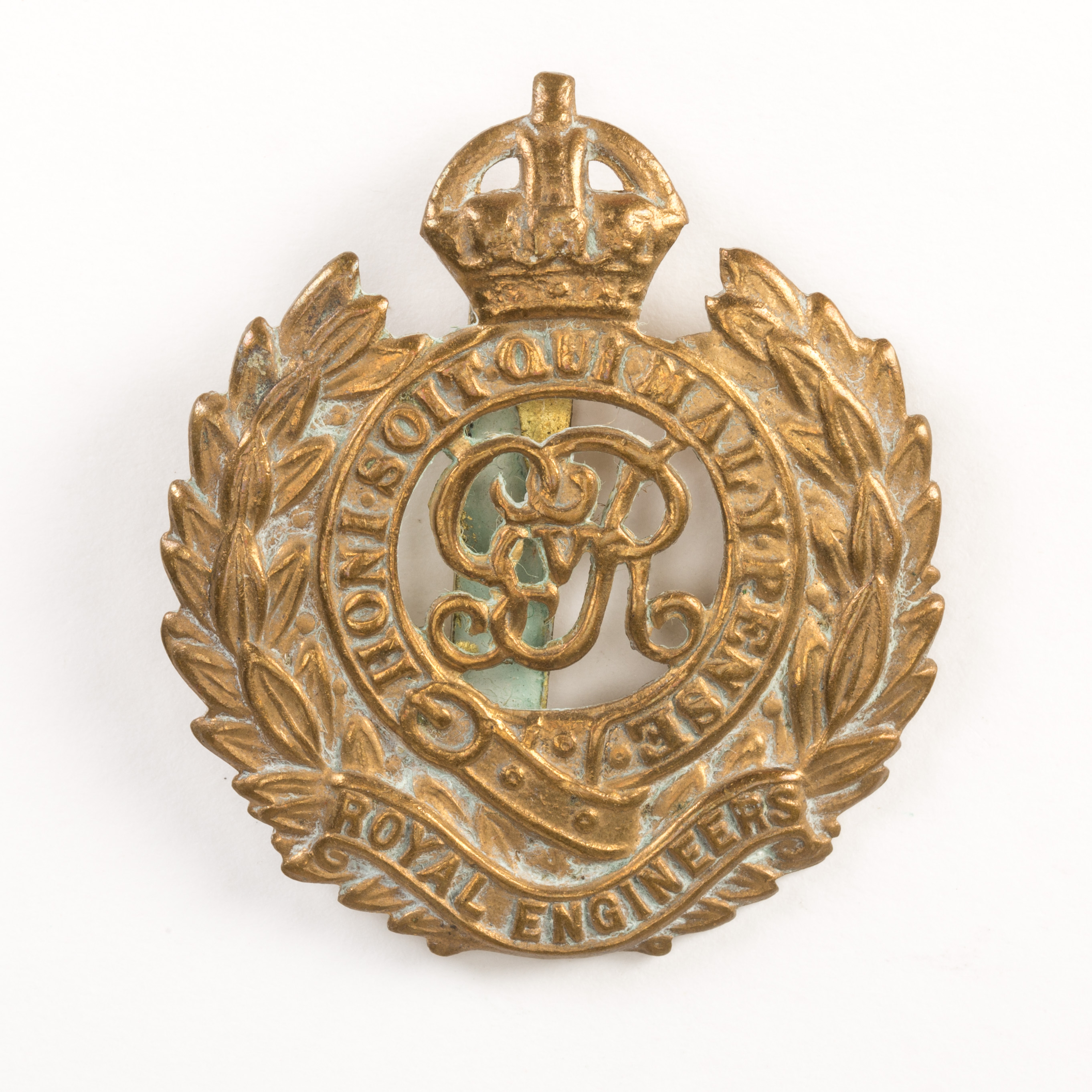
RE Cap badge (King George V cipher)

In 1907, the War Office decided to hand all submarine mining duties over to Militia units and the Volunteer submarine miners were disbanded or converted to other roles. Several were converted into Electrical Engineers to make wider use of the coast defence searchlights that had been used to illuminate the minefields. Thus, the Edinburgh-based unit became the Forth Division (Electrical Engineers) (Volunteers), but the Haldane Reforms came into effect the following year, under which all the Volunteers were subsumed into the Territorial Force (TF). The Forth Division was retitled as the City of Edinburgh (Fortress) Royal Engineers.

By World War I, the unit's organisation was as follows:
City of Edinburgh (Fortress) Royal Engineers

- HQ at 28 York Place, Edinburgh
- No 1 Works Company
- No 2 Electric Lights Company

== World War I ==
On the outbreak of war in August 1914, the City of Edinburgh Fortress Engineers mobilised and moved into their war stations in the Forth Defences. Britain's harbour defences were never seriously tested during the war, but the fortress engineers formed companies for service with the armies in the field. On 31 August 1914, the formation of Reserve or 2nd-Line units for each existing TF unit was authorised, formed from men who had not volunteered for overseas service. During 1915, the City of Edinburgh unit formed 1/1st Edinburgh Field Company composed of 1st Line Territorials. The field company was attached to 69th (2nd East Anglian) Division at Thetford from 16 November until 19 December 1915, on which day it embarked at Devonport and sailed for Egypt. Disembarking at Port Said on 3–5 January 1916, it was allotted to 'Army Troops', working on the Suez Canal Defences.

On 17 April, the company re-embarked at Alexandria and sailed to join the British Expeditionary Force in France, disembarking at Marseille on 24 April. It was assigned to 56th (1/1st London) Division on 27 April 1916, and posted to 169th (3rd London) Brigade.

=== Battle of the Somme ===
For the opening of the Battle of the Somme, the 56th Division was tasked with making a diversionary attack on the Gommecourt Salient. The divisional commander considered that No-man's land was too wide for a successful attack, so on the night of 26/27 May (after two days of rehearsals) the Edinburgh Field Company assisted 167th (1st London) Brigade in digging a new jumping-off line closer to the enemy. German reconnaissance aircraft were kept away by a Royal Flying Corps standing patrol during daylight, and the new line was completed on 27/28 May. The operation was audacious and completely successful.

During the next month, the Edinburgh Field Company lost several casualties from German counter-bombardment during the preparations for the battle. When the attack went in on 1 July, the company's roles were to mark communication trenches to be dug across No-man's land by 1/3rd Battalion, London Regiment, to establish dumps of engineering stores in the captured German lines, to remove barricades and build trench bridges in the British trenches. These tasks proved impossible under intense German shellfire, and the attempts to carry them out were costly. The divisional attack was a failure.

56th Division returned to action in the latter stages of the Somme offensive:

- Battle of Ginchy, in which the division attacked in the evening of 9 September but failed to capture Combles or The Quadrilateral despite a renewed attack at dawn.
- Battle of Flers-Courcelette, in which the division attacked Bouleaux Wood on 15 September with the assistance of tanks, but was once again held up until 18 September by the strongpoint of The Quadrilateral.
- Battle of Morval, when the German defences crumbled and Bouleaux Wood was finally taken on 25 September.
- Capture of Combles on 26 September.
- Battle of the Transloy Ridges When the offensive was renewed on 7 October, the division's objective was a line of enemy trenches, after which it was to establish a line along the crest of the ridge and then on the forward slope. The Edinburgh Field Company was assigned to the attacking brigades to consolidate these positions. However, the weather and mud were so bad that after three days the division had only gained footholds in the enemy trenches. It was relieved on the night of 9 October.

=== 1917 ===
On 30 January 1917, the unit was numbered as 416th (Edinburgh) Field Company, Royal Engineers. With 56th Division it took part in following up the German retreat to Hindenburg Line in the spring of 1917, followed by the First and Second Battle of the Scarpe during the Arras Offensive.

Later in the year, it participated in the Battle of Langemarck (part of the Third Ypres Offensive), and then was heavily engaged in the Battle of Cambrai:

- Tadpole Copse
- Bourlon Wood
- German counter-attack

=== 1918 ===
During the German spring offensive of March 1918, 56th Division was engaged at the First Battle of Arras 1918.

When the Allies began their Hundred Days Offensive, the division took part in:

- Battle of Albert
- Battle of the Scarpe
- Battle of the Canal du Nord
- Battle of Cambrai
- Pursuit to the Selle

Corporal James McPhie, VC.

During the night of 12/13 October, 416th Field Company completed a floating bridge across the Sensée Canal, which allowed two companies of 1/2nd Londons to cross. At 05.15 one of these companies attacked under a covering barrage and surprised Aubigny-au-Bac, taking many German prisoners but the Germans counter-attacked the following morning, and the companies were withdrawn at dusk. That night a fresh patrol went across the footbridge, despite the Germans being within hand grenade range. The bridge broke, and Cpl James McPhie and Spr Cox, of 416th Fd Co jumped into the water to hold it together. McPhie and his men then set about repairing the bridge after daybreak, while under fire. McPhie and Cox were both mortally wounded, but the bridge held and the bridgehead was maintained until after 56th Division had been relieved by 4th Canadian Division on 14 October. Corporal McPhie was awarded a posthumous Victoria Cross.

The division then participated in the Battle of the Sambre and finally the Passage of the Grande Honnelle, before the war was ended by the Armistice with Germany.

=== 2nd Line ===
The 2/1st Edinburgh Field Company (later numbered 418th (Lowland) Reserve Field Company) served at home until at least 1917.

== Interwar ==
Postwar, the City of Edinburgh Fortress Engineers continued in the reformed Territorial Amy (TA) with the following organisation:
City of Edinburgh (Fortress) RE

- No 1 (Works) Company
- No 2 (Lights) Company
- No 3 (Lights) Company

The unit was employed as Coast Defence Troops in 52nd (Lowland) Divisional Area.

== World War II ==
By the outbreak of war in September 1939, the Edinburgh Fortress Engineers had been reduced to a single company (No 1 Electric Light & Works Company) in the fixed defences under Scottish Command. However, by September 1940, it had been converted into a field engineer unit as Edinburgh Corps Troops Royal Engineers, with 585th, 586th and 587th Army Field Companies.

In July 1942, the unit was reorganised again as 1st Army Troops RE (1st ATRE) to form part of First Army, which was preparing to take part in the Operation Torch landings in North Africa later in the year. 585th Company was converted into an 'Army Field Park Company', which acted as a base for the field companies and held specialist equipment. 1st ATRE was joined by 561st Field Company, which had originally been part of the 38th (Welsh) Infantry Division, but left when that division was placed on a lower establishment in November 1941.

=== Tunisian campaign ===
During Torch, a large part of 585th Field Park Company was lost at sea, including its vital equipment. After the landings, the engineering work required was considerable, while the arrival of engineer units was slow and they were widely scattered. In December 1942, a month after the first landing, the Commanding Royal Engineer (CRE) of 1st ATRE, Lt-Col L.E.A. Gwynne, commanded the advanced engineering base at Bône in Tunisia with 587th Field Company and other workshop and park units. Allied ports and bases suffered severely from enemy bombing, and the CRE spent several nights directing the rescue of personnel trapped in bombed buildings at Bône. Meanwhile, 586th Field Company was working in the Philippeville, Algeria area, including preparing approach roads and cuttings for the 160-foot span Bailey bridge erected at Souk El Khemis. By February, the CRE was in charge of bridging and road improvements to allow transporters carrying the new heavy Churchill tank to reach their concentration area at El Kef.

During the Battle of Kasserine Pass, in February 1943, the right flank of the British V Corps was uncovered, and formations were hastily improvised to fill the gap, including Nickforce and 1st (Guards) Brigade. A composite RE force, including 561st and 587th Field Companies, was sent up, and over three nights laid an extensive minefield under fire from enemy tanks.

To support Eighth Army's attack on Wadi Akarit on 6 April, First Army attacked towards Kairouan to cut off the enemy retreat. The approach roads for 128th Infantry Brigade Group were little more than 150 miles of sand tracks, and had to be improved by 586th Field Company, assisted by US engineers from II Corps. On 8 April, 128th Bde captured Pichon in an operation requiring two crossings of the bed of the Oued Marguellil and considerable mine clearance. The Tunisian campaign ended on 12 May with the surrender of Armeegruppe Afrika.

=== Italian campaign ===
First Army was disbanded at the end of the campaign, and 1st ATRE was transferred to Eighth Army in July 1943 and redesignated 8th Army Troops RE (8th ATRE). Eighth Army began landings in southern Italy on 3 September 1943 and started to advance up the eastern side of the country, using the coastal Highway 16. At San Salvo the Germans had blown a 340-foot gap in the multi-span brick arch bridge, and destroyed the piers. 561st and 586th Field Companies started work on a replacement the same night that San Salvo was captured, and within 36 hours had built three temporary piers and launched a 340-foot Bailey bridge. Once Taranto had been occupied, 8th ATRE worked with 160th Railway Construction Company RE to rebuild the east coast railways, using Bailey equipment for three important bridges, almost the first time it had been used for a railway.

After the Battle of the Sangro (19 November–3 December), the River Sangro rose rapidly and swept away all the temporary bridges. 8th ATRE began urgent work on 4 December for a high-level Sangro Bridge on Highway 16, the site being floodlit at night. This, which was longest Bailey bridge built during the Italian campaign, was opened to traffic on 14 December.

After the German Winter Line had been breached in the summer of 1944, Eighth Army renewed its advance up Highway 16, with 561st and 586th Field Companies completing a Bailey bridge and a causeway across the River Cessano to prepare the jumping-off line for the assault crossing of the River Metauro on 25 August, after which 586th and 587th Field Companies bridged the Metauro to continue the highway and the causeway while the army moved on to breach the Gothic Line.

In early 1945, 8th ATRE was part of a large engineer force, known as the Po Task Force, which was formed to prepare for the formidable crossing of the River Po. On 9 and 11 April the Senio and Santerno were crossed as the army advanced into the Po Valley, and in the days that followed, 8th ATRE built Bailey bridges across these rivers. The 360-foot Santerno bridge was jointly built with the South African Corps Troops Engineers, SAEC, and was thus named the 'Springlish' bridge. On 19 April, 8th ATRE was called in to dam the Marina Canal and prevent flooding. In the final stages of the campaign, the Po and Adige were rapidly crossed, and 8th ATRE remained behind to build a 400-foot high-level Bailey bridge over the Adige to maintain the army's communications. This was begun on 30 April and opened on 6 May, hostilities in Italy having ended on 2 May.

8th ATRE was disbanded in or after September 1945.

== Postwar ==
When the TA was reconstituted in 1947, 585 (Edinburgh) Field Squadron, RE was formed as an independent unit assigned to 155th (Lowland) Independent Infantry Brigade, but in 1950 it was absorbed into 124 Field Engineer Regiment, RE, the divisional engineers of 52nd (Lowland) Division. A new 586th Independent Field Squadron had been formed by 1956, and in that year a new 585th was formed in 124 Field Engineer Regiment by conversion of part of 413th (Fife) Coast Regiment, Royal Artillery.

In 1961, 585 and 586 Field Squadrons merged with 432 Light Anti-Aircraft Regiment, RA to form 432 (City of Edinburgh) Corps Engineer Regiment, RE. In the reduction of the TA in 1967, 432 Regiment became 104 (City of Edinburgh) Field Sqn in 71 (Scottish) Engineer Regiment. The squadron was disbanded on 1 July 1999.

== Honorary Colonel ==
Honorary Lt-Col Commandant:

- John Hope, 1st Marquess of Linlithgow, KT, GCMG, GCVO, appointed 4 April 1888.

Honorary Colonel:

- Colonel T.E. Salvesen, appointed 15 January 1938.
- Colonel Edward Bruce, 10th Earl of Elgin and Kincardine, KT, CMG, TD.

== Insignia ==
1st (and later 8th) ATRE used as its formation badge the badge of the old submarine miners (a winged hand holding thunderbolts emerging from a mural crown) in red on a dark blue square with a Saltire (St Andrews cross) in red with blue stripes.

== External sources ==
- British Army units from 1945 on
- Commonwealth War Graves Commission
- Flags of the World
- Land Forces of Britain, the Empire and Commonwealth (Regiments.org)
- Orders of Battle at Patriot Files
- Graham Watson, The Territorial Army 1947
