= List of battalions of the Royal Scots =

This is a list of battalions of the Royal Scots, which existed as an infantry regiment of the British Army from 1633 to 2006.

== Original composition ==
In 1881, under the Cardwell-Childers reforms of the British Armed Forces, one pre-existent militia and seven volunteer battalions of Edinburgh, Midlothian, Berwickshire, Haddingtonshire and Linlithgowshire were integrated into the structure of the Royal Scots. Volunteer battalions had been created in reaction to a perceived threat of invasion by France in the late 1850s. Organised as "rifle volunteer corps", they were independent of the British Army and composed primarily of the middle class. The only change to the regiment's structure during the period of 1881–1908, was the loss of the 1st Berwickshire Rifle Volunteer Corps, and the numbering of the remaining Rifle Volunteer Corps into Volunteer Battalions.

Battalion	Formed	Formerly
Regular
1st	1625	
2nd	1686	
3rd	1804 (disbanded 1817)	
4th	1804 (disbanded 1816)	
Militia
3rd (Militia)	1798	Queen's Edinburgh Light Infantry Militia
Volunteers
1st Volunteer	1859	1st Battalion, 1st Edinburgh (City) Rifle Volunteer Corps
2nd Volunteer	1865	2nd Battalion, 1st Edinburgh (City) Rifle Volunteer Corps
3rd Volunteer	1888	
4th Volunteer	1859	2nd Edinburgh (City) Rifle Volunteer Corps
5th Volunteer	1859	1st Midlothian (Leith) Rifle Volunteer Corps
6th Volunteer	1860	2nd Midlothian (Midlothian and Peebles-shire) Rifle Volunteer Corps
7th Volunteer	1860	1st Haddington Rifle Volunteer Corps
8th Volunteer	1860	1st Linlithgowshire Rifle Volunteer Corps
9th (Highlanders) Volunteer	1900	

== Reorganisation ==
The Territorial Force (later Territorial Army) was formed in 1908, which the volunteer battalions joined, while the militia battalions transferred to the "Special Reserve". All volunteer battalions were renumbered to create a single sequential order.

Battalion	Formerly
4th (Queen's Edinburgh Rifles)	1st Volunteer Battalion (along with elements of 3rd Volunteer Battalion)
5th (Queen's Edinburgh Rifles)	2nd Volunteer Battalion (along with elements of 3rd Volunteer Battalion)
6th	4th Volunteer Battalion
7th	5th Volunteer Battalion
8th	6th Volunteer Battalion
9th (Highlanders)	9th Volunteer Battalion (Highlanders)
10th (Cyclist)	8th Volunteer Battalion

== First World War ==
The Royal Scots fielded 35 battalions and lost 11,213 officers and other ranks during the course of the war. The regiment's territorial components formed duplicate second and third line battalions. As an example, the battalions of the 4th King's were numbered as the 1/4th, 2/4th, and 3/4th respectively. Many battalions of the Royal Scots were formed as part of Secretary of State for War Lord Kitchener's appeal for an initial 100,000 men volunteers in 1914. They were referred to as the New Army or Kitchener's Army. The 15th to 18th King's, New Army "Service" battalions, were referred to as the "Pals" because they were predominantly composed of colleagues. The Volunteer Training Corps were raised with overage or reserved occupation men early in the war, and were initially self-organised into many small corps, with a wide variety of names. Recognition of the corps by the authorities brought regulation and as the war continued the small corps were formed into battalion sized units of the county Volunteer Regiment. In 1918 these were linked to county regiments.

Battalion	Formed	Served	Fate
Regular
1st	1625	Western Front	
2nd	1686	Western Front	
Special Reserve
3rd (Reserve)	1798	Britain, Ireland	
Territorial Force
1/4th (Queen's Edinburgh Rifles)	1859	Western Front	See Inter-War
1/5th (Queen's Edinburgh Rifles)	1865	Gallipoli, Western Front	Amalgamated with 1/6th in June 1916
1/6th	1859	North Africa, Western Front	Amalgamated with 1/5th in June 1916
1/7th	1859	Gallipoli, Middle East, Western Front	See Inter-War
1/8th	1860	Western Front	See Inter-War
1/9th (Highlanders)	1900	Western Front	See Inter-War
1/10th (Cyclist)	1860	Britain, Ireland	See Inter-War
2/4th (Queen's Edinburgh Rifles)	Edinburgh, September 1914	Britain, Ireland	Disbanded in August 1917
2/5th (Queen's Edinburgh Rifles)	Edinburgh, September 1914	Britain, Ireland	Absorbed into 2/4th (Queen's Edinburgh Rifles) in November 1916
2/6th	Edinburgh, March 1915	Britain, Ireland	Merged with 2/4th (Queen's Edinburgh Rifles) in November 1915
2/7th	Leith, August 1914	Britain, Ireland	Disbanded in March 1918
2/8th	Haddington, September 1914	Britain, Ireland	Disbanded in Summer 1917
2/9th (Highlanders)	Edinburgh, September 1914	Britain, Ireland	Disbanded in July 1918
2/10th (Cyclist)	Linlithgow, September 1914	North Russia	Disbanded June 1919
3/4th (Queen's Edinburgh Rifles)	Peebles, May 1915	Britain, Ireland	Absorbed into 4th (Reserve) Battalion in July 1916
3/5th (Queen's Edinburgh Rifles)	Peebles, May 1915	Britain, Ireland	Absorbed into 4th (Reserve) Battalion in July 1916
3/6th	Peebles, July 1915	Britain, Ireland	Absorbed into 4th (Reserve) Battalion in July 1916
3/7th	Peebles, June 1915	Britain, Ireland	Absorbed into 4th (Reserve) Battalion in July 1916
3/8th	Peebles, December 1914	Britain, Ireland	Absorbed into 4th (Reserve) Battalion in July 1916
3/9th	Peebles, June 1915	Britain, Ireland	Absorbed into 4th (Reserve) Battalion in July 1917
4th (Reserve)	Hawick, June 1916	Britain, Ireland	Disbanded in 1918
5th/6th	France, July 1916	Western Front	Disbanded sometime after October 1919
New Army
11th (Service)	Edinburgh, August 1914	Western Front	Disbanded sometime after November 1919
12th (Service)	Edinburgh, August 1914	Western Front	Disbanded in June 1919
13th (Service)	Edinburgh, August 1914	Western Front	Disbanded in June 1919
14th (Reserve)	Weymouth, November 1914	Britain, Ireland	Became the 54th Training Reserve Battalion, February 1916
15th (1st City of Edinburgh) (Service) (Cranston's Battalion)	Edinburgh, September 1914	Western Front	Disbanded in August 1918
16th (2nd City of Edinburgh) (Service) (McCrae's Battalion)	Edinburgh, December 1914	Western Front	Disbanded in August 1918
17th (Service) (Rosebery's Bantams)	Edinburgh, February 1915	Western Front	Disbanded sometime after April 1919
18th (Reserve)	Edinburgh, July 1915	Britain, Ireland	Became the 77th Training Battalion, September 1916
Others
19th (Labour)	Blairgowrie, April 1916	Western Front	Transferred to Labour Corps as 1st and 2nd Labour Companies, in April 1917
1st Garrison	Edinburgh, August 1915	Britain, Egypt, Cyprus	Disbanded in May 1919
2nd Garrison	Leith, August 1916	Britain	Became 1st Battalion, Royal Defence Corps, August 1917
Volunteer Training Corps
1/1st Battalion City of Edinburgh Volunteer Regiment later the 1st Volunteer Battalion, Royal Scots Regiment		Edinburgh	Disbanded post war
2/1st Battalion City of Edinburgh Volunteer Regiment later the 2nd Volunteer Battalion, Royal Scots Regiment		Edinburgh	Disbanded post war
1/1st Battalion Midlothian Volunteer Regiment later the 3rd Volunteer Battalion, Royal Scots Regiment		Edinburgh	Disbanded post war
2/1st Battalion Midlothian Volunteer Regiment later the 4th Volunteer Battalion, Royal Scots Regiment		Lieth	Disbanded post war
1st Battalion Haddingtonshire Volunteer Regiment later the 5th Volunteer Battalion, Royal Scots Regiment		Haddington	Disbanded post war
1st Battalion Linlithgowshire Volunteer Regiment later the 6th Volunteer Battalion, Royal Scots Regiment		Linlithgow	Disbanded post war
1st Battalion Peebles-shire Volunteer Regiment later the 7th Volunteer Battalion, Royal Scots Regiment		Peebles	Disbanded post war

== Inter-War ==
By 1922, all of the regiment's war-raised battalions had disbanded. The King's Regiment did not, however, return to its original peacetime size; it lost many of its territorial battalions shortly after the war ended. The Special Reserve reverted to its militia designation in 1921, then to the Supplementary Reserve in 1924; however, its battalions were effectively placed in 'suspended animation'. As World War II approached, the Territorial Army was reorganised in the mid-1930s, many of its infantry battalions were converted to other roles, especially anti-aircraft.

Battalion	Fate
4th (Queen's Edinburgh Rifles)	Absorbed 5th (Queen's Edinburgh Rifles) Battalion, and 10th (Cyclist) Battalion, to form 4th/5th Battalion (Queen's Edinburgh Rifles) in 1921
5th (Queen's Edinburgh Rifles)	Amalgamated with 4th Battalion (Queen's Edinburgh Rifles), to form 4th/5th Battalion (Queen's Edinburgh Rifles) in 1921
6th	Amalgamated with 8th Battalion, and transferred to the Royal Garrison Artillery, forming part of 57th (Lowland) Medium Brigade in 1921
7th	Absorbed 9th (Highlanders) Battalion, to form 7th/9th Battalion in 1921
8th	Amalgamated with 6th Battalion, and transferred to the Royal Garrison Artillery, forming part of 57th (Lowland) Medium Brigade in 1921
9th (Highlanders)	Amalgamated with 7th Battalion, to form 7th/9th Battalion in 1921
10th (Cyclist)	Absorbed into 4th/5th Battalion, as A Company, in 1921

== Second World War ==
The Royal Scots expansion during the Second World War was modest compared to 1914–1918. National Defence Companies were combined to create a new "Home Defence" battalion. In addition 17 battalions of the Home Guard were affiliated to the regiment, wearing its cap badge, and also by 1944 two batteries of [Anti-Aircraft] rocket batteries (Z Battery. A Light Anti-Aircraft (LAA) troop was formed from one of the local battalions to defend a power station. Due to the daytime (or shift working) occupations of the men in the LAA troops, the troops required eight times the manpower of an equivalent regular unit.

Battalion	Formed	Served	Fate
Regular
1st	1625	France, India Burma	See Post-World War II
2nd	1686	Hong Kong, Italy Palestine	See Post-World War II
Territorial Army
4th/5th (Queen's Edinburgh Rifles) (52nd Searchlight Regiment)	1921	Britain	Transferred to the Royal Artillery, July 1940 and became 52nd Searchlight Regiment (Queen's Edinburgh, Royal Scots)
7th/9th (Highlanders)	1921	Britain, Western Front	See Post-World War II
8th (Lothians and Peebleshire)	Formed as a duplicate of 7th/9th (Highlanders), August 1939	Britain, France, North West Europe	See Post-World War II
10th (Home Defence)	Late 1939	Britain	Redesignated as the 30th Battalion, 1941
11th (Home Defence)	Late 1939	Britain	Disbanded in 1940
12th	October 1940	Britain	Disbanded in 1942
30th	Redesignation of 10th (Home Defence) Battalion, 1941	Britain	Disbanded in 1943
Others
50th (Holding)	June 1940	Britain	Redesignated as the 12th Battalion, October 1940

Home Guard
Battalion	Headquarters	Formation Sign (dark blue on khaki)	Battalion	Headquarters	Formation Sign (dark blue on khaki)
Edinburgh
1st	City of Edinburgh	EGH 1	2nd	City of Edinburgh	EGH 2
3rd	City of Edinburgh	EGH 3	4th (Portobello)	City of Edinburgh	EGH 4
5th	City of Edinburgh	EGH 5	6th	City of Edinburgh	EGH 6
7th (Musselburgh)	City of Edinburgh	EGH 7	8th	City of Edinburgh	EGH 8
9th (University STC)	City of Edinburgh	EGH 9	10th (3rd Bn London and North Easter Railway)	City of Edinburgh	EGH 10
11th (11 G.P.O.)	City of Edinburgh	EGH 11			
West Lothian
1st	North Berwick	EL 1	2nd	Haddington	EL 2
Mid Lothian
1st	Edinburgh	ML 1	2nd	Dalkeith	ML 2
East Lothian
1st	Edinburgh	WL 1	2nd	Bathgate	WL 2
Home Guard Light Anti-Aircraft units
Formation Sign (dark blue on khaki)	Headquarters or Location	AA Formation and Designation	Formation Sign (dark blue on khaki)	Headquarters or Location	AA Formation and Designation
EGH 101	Portobello	208th Battery 20th Anti Aircraft Regiment (Home Guard)	EGH 102	Edinburgh	217th Battery 20th Anti Aircraft Regiment (Home Guard)
EGH 4	Portobello; Electricity Power station	A Troop LAA			

== Post-World War II ==
In the immediate post-war period, the army was significantly reduced: nearly all infantry regiments had their first and second battalions amalgamated and the Supplementary Reserve disbanded.

Battalion	Fate
1st	Amalgamated with the remaining five Scottish infantry regiments, to form the Royal Regiment of Scotland, March 2006
2nd	Disbanded February 1949
3rd	Disbanded 1953
7th/9th (Highlanders)	Absorbed duplicate 8th Battalion, April 1961, and renumbered 8th/9th Battalion; Disbanded 1967, as two separate companies: A Company, 52nd Lowland Volunteers and A Company, The Royal Scots and Cameronians Territorials
8th (Lothians and Peebleshire)	Amalgamated with 7/9th Battalion, to form 8th/9th Battalion, April 1961

== Bibliography ==
- James, Brigadier E.A. (1978). British Regiments 1914–18. London: Samson Books Limited. ISBN 0-906304-03-2.
- Whittacker, L B (1990). Stand Down. Orders of battle for the units of the Home Guard of the United Kingdom, November 1944. Newport: Ray Westlake Military Books. ISBN 1871167140.
