= List of battalions of the Buffs (Royal East Kent Regiment) =

This is a list of battalions of the Buffs (Royal East Kent Regiment), which existed as an infantry regiment of the British Army from 1881 to 1961.

== Original composition ==
When the 3rd (The East Kent) Regiment of Foot became the Buffs (East Kent Regiment) in 1881 under the Cardwell-Childers reforms of the British Armed Forces, four pre-existent militia and volunteer battalions of Kent were integrated into the structure of the regiment. Volunteer battalions had been created in reaction to a perceived threat of invasion by France in the late 1850s. Organised as "rifle volunteer corps", they were independent of the British Army and composed primarily of the middle class. The only change to the regiment's structure during the period of 1881-1908 occurred in 1888, when the two militia battalions of the regiment amalgamated.

Battalion	Formed	Formerly
Regular
1st	1572	1st Battalion, 3rd Regiment of Foot
2nd	1857	2nd Battalion, 3rd Regiment of Foot
Militia
3rd (Militia)	1760	1st Battalion, East Kent Militia
4th (Militia)	1876	2nd Battalion, East Kent Militia
Volunteers
1st Volunteer	1859	2nd Kent (East Kent) Rifle Volunteer Corps
2nd (The Weald of Kent) Volunteer	1860	5th Kent (The Weald of Kent) Rifle Volunteer Corps

== Reorganisation ==
The Territorial Force (later Territorial Army) was formed in 1908, which the volunteer battalions joined, while the militia battalions transferred to the "Special Reserve". All volunteer battalions were renumbered to create a single sequential order.

Battalion	Formerly
4th	1st Volunteer Battalion
5th (The Weald of Kent)	2nd (The Weald of Kent) Volunteer Battalion

== First World War ==
The Buffs fielded 15 battalions and lost over 6,000 officers and other ranks during the course of the war. The regiment's territorial components formed duplicate second and third line battalions. As an example, the three-line battalions of the 4th Buffs were numbered as the 1/4th, 2/4th, and 3/4th respectively. Many battalions of the regiment were formed as part of Secretary of State for War Lord Kitchener's appeal for an initial 100,000 men volunteers in 1914. They were referred to as the New Army or Kitchener's Army. The Volunteer Training Corps were raised with overage or reserved occupation men early in the war, and were initially self-organised into many small corps, with a wide variety of names. Recognition of the corps by the authorities brought regulation and as the war continued the small corps were formed into battalion sized units of the county Volunteer Regiment. In 1918 these were linked to county regiments.

Battalion	Formed	Served	Fate
Regular
1st	1572	Western Front	
2nd	1857	Western Front, Salonika	
Special Reserve
3rd (Reserve)	1760	Britain	
Territorial Force
1/4th	1859	India, Aden	See Inter-War
1/5th (The Weald of Kent)	1860	India, Mesopotamian	See Inter-War
2/4th	Canterbury, September 1914	Britain	Disbanded in November 1917
2/5th (The Weald of Kent)	Ashford, September 1914	Britain	Disbanded in November 1917
3/4th, 4th (Reserve) from 8 April 1916	Canterbury, July 1915	Britain	Disbanded in 1919
3/5th (The Weald of Kent), 5th (The Weald of Kent) (Reserve) from 8 April 1916	Ashford, March 1915	Britain	Absorbed into the 4th (Reserve) Battalion on 1 September 1916
10th (Royal East Kent & West Kent Yeomanry)	Sollum, 1 February 1917, from the 1/1st Royal East Kent Yeomanry and 1/1st Queen's Own West Kent Yeomanry	Western Front	Disembodied 1919
New Army
6th (Service)	Canterbury, August 1914	Western Front	Disbanded in 1919
7th (Service)	Canterbury, September 1914	Western Front	Disbanded in 1919
8th (Service)	Canterbury, September 1914	Western Front	Disbanded on 13 February 1918
9th (Reserve)	Dover, October 1914	Britain	Became the 29th Training Reserve Battalion of the 7th Reserve Brigade on 1 September 1916
Others
1st (Home Service) Garrison	Dover, 29 April 1916	Britain	Became 2nd Battalion, Royal Defence Corps
Volunteer Training Corps
1st Battalion (Cinque Ports) Kent Volunteer Regiment later the 1st Volunteer Battalion, Buffs (East Kent Regiment)		Hythe	Disbanded post war
2nd Battalion (St. Augustine's) Kent Volunteer Regiment later the 2nd Volunteer Battalion, Buffs (East Kent Regiment)		Canterbury	Disbanded post war
4th Battalion (Thanet) Kent Volunteer Regiment later the 3rd Volunteer Battalion, Buffs (East Kent Regiment)		Thanet	Disbanded post war

== Inter-War ==
By 1920, all of the regiment's war-raised battalions had disbanded. The Special Reserve reverted to its militia designation in 1921, then to the Supplementary Reserve in 1924; however, its battalions were effectively placed in 'suspended animation'. As World War II approached, the Territorial Army was reorganised in the mid-1930s, many of its infantry battalions were converted to other roles, especially anti-aircraft.

Battalion	Fate
4th	Absorbed 5th (The Weald of Kent) Battalion, without a change in title on 26 August 1921
5th (The Weald of Kent)	Absorbed by 4th Battalion on 26 August 1921

== Second World War ==
The Buff's expansion during the Second World War was modest compared to 1914–1918. National Defence Companies were combined to create a new "Home Defence" battalion, In addition to this, 12 of the 39 Kent battalions of the Home Guard were affiliated to the regiment, wearing its cap badge.

Battalion	Formed	Served	Fate
Regular
1st	1572	North Africa, Italy	See Post-World War II
2nd	1857	France, North Africa, Burma	See Post-World War II
Supplementary Reserve
3rd	1760		See Post-World War II
Territorial Army
4th, (redesignation of 4th/5th Battalion)	1859	France, Malta, Greece	See Post-World War II
5th (The Weald of Kent)	31 March 1939, as a duplicate of 4th Battalion	France, North Africa, Sicily, Italy	Disbanded on 1 January 1947
6th (Home Defence)	November 1939	Britain	Redesignated as 30th Battalion in December 1941
7th	July 1940	Britain	Converted to 141st Regiment Royal Armoured Corps, in November 1941
8th	July 1940, from a cadre of The Duke of Cornwall's Light Infantry	Britain	Converted to 9th Medium Regiment, Royal Artillery in November 1942
9th	July 1940, from a cadre of the Northamptonshire Regiment	Britain	Disbanded 1946
10th	July 1940	Britain	Disbanded in October 1943
11th	October 1940, as a redesignation of the 50th (Holding) Battalion	Britain	Converted to 89th Light Anti-Aircraft Regiment, Royal Artillery in November 1940
30th	December 1941, as a redesignation of the 6th (Home Defence) Battalion	Britain	Disbanded in March 1943
Others
70th (Young Soldiers)	September 1940	Britain	Disbanded January 1943

Home Guard
Battalion	Headquarters	Formation Sign (dark blue on khaki)	Battalion	Headquarters	Formation Sign (dark blue on khaki)
1st	Ashford	KT 1	2nd	Charing	KT 2
3rd	Canterbury	KT 3	4th (St. Augustine's)	Canterbury	KT 4
5th	Wingham	KT 5	6th (Thanet)	Margate	KT 6
7th	Lyminge	KT 7	8th (Cinque Ports)	Folkestone	KT 8
9th	Faversham	KT 9	10th	Sittingbourne	KT10
23rd	Hawkhurst	KT 23	30th (Sheppey)	Sheerness	KT 30

== Post-World War II ==
In the immediate post-war period, the army was significantly reduced: nearly all infantry regiments had their first and second battalions amalgamated and the Supplementary Reserve disbanded.

Battalion	Fate
1st	Amalgamated with 2nd Battalion on the 23 September 1949, without a change in title
2nd	Amalgamated with 1st Battalion on the 23 September 1949
4th	Redesignated the 4th/5th Battalion on 1 January 1947
5th	Redesignated the 4th/5th Battalion on 1 January 1947

== Amalgamation ==
In 1956, the 5th Battalion was reformed, leading to the 4th/5th Battalion being redesignated as the 4th Battalion. The 1957 Defence White Paper stated that the Buffs was due to amalgamated with the Queen's Own Royal West Kent Regiment, to form the Queen's Own Buffs, The Royal Kent Regiment on the 1 March 1961.

Battalion	Fate
1st	Amalgamated with 1st Battalion, The Queen's Own Royal West Kent Regiment, to form 1st Battalion, The Queen's Own Buffs, The Royal Kent Regiment
4th	Transferred to the Queen's Own Buffs, The Royal Kent Regiment without a change in title
5th	Transferred to the Queen's Own Buffs, The Royal Kent Regiment without a change in title

== Sources ==
- J.B.M. Frederick, Lineage Book of British Land Forces 1660–1978, Vol I, Wakefield: Microform Academic, 1984, ISBN 1-85117-007-3.
- Brig E.A. James, British Regiments 1914–18, London: Samson Books, 1978/Uckfield: Naval & Military Press, 2001, ISBN 978-1-84342-197-9.
- Joslen, Lt-Col H.F. (2003). Orders of Battle, United Kingdom and Colonial Formations and Units in the Second World War, 1939–1945. Uckfield: Naval & Military. ISBN 1843424746.
- The Long, Long Trail
