= Farrimond =

Farrimond is an English surname, derived from the Norman name Faramund. Notable people with the surname include:

- Arthur Farrimond (1893–1978), British athlete
- Barry Farrimond or Farrimond-Chuong, British actor and worker for disabled children's music
- Bill Farrimond (1903–1979), English cricketer
- Richard Farrimond (born 1947), British engineer and astronaut
- Syd Farrimond (1940–2022), English footballer
