= 9th Battalion, Royal Scots =

9th Volunteer Battalion, Royal Scots 9th (Highlanders) Battalion, Royal Scots
- Active: 1900–1921
- Country: United Kingdom
- Branch: Territorial Force
- Role: Infantry
- Size: Battalion
- Part of: Lothian Brigade
- Garrison/HQ: Hepburn House, Edinburgh
- Nickname: The Dandy Ninth
- Engagements: Second Boer War; Western Front

Commanders
- Notable commanders: Lt-Col James Ferguson; Lt-Col Alexander Blair; Lt-Col William Green

The 9th Battalion, Royal Scots was the highland (kilted) battalion of the Royal Scots. Formed in 1900 as a part-time Volunteer Force battalion in Edinburgh, in 1908, as part of the Haldane Reforms, it became a Territorial Force battalion. During the First World War it served on the Western Front. Post-war it was amalgamated with the 7th Battalion to form 7th/9th Royal Scots. Notable members of the battalion include James Pearson, Arthur Farrimond, Jimmy Broad, Robert Dudgeon, Major Archibald Alexander Gordon, Walter Lyon, FCB Cadell and William Geissler.

== Volunteer Force ==
Following British Army losses in December 1899, during the Black Week of the Second Boer War, there was widespread recruitment into the Volunteer Force. James Ferguson of Kinmundy (1857-1917), King's Counsel and Volunteer officer, applied to form a new Volunteer battalion in Edinburgh that would be a highland, kilted unit. He wrote that "It had long been felt to be unfortunate that the capital of Scotland, which drew to itself so many young men from the country north of the Forth and Clyde, forming the old Scottish kingdom of ancient Alban, possessed no Volunteer corps clothed in the garb of old Gaul, and providing special attractions for the Highlanders and the sons of Highlanders who had, in the conditions of modern life, come to push their fortunes in Edinburgh." Originally part of the Queen's Rifle Volunteer Brigade, the battalion achieved independence as the 9th (Highlanders) Volunteer Battalion in July 1901 and established headquarters at 7 Wemyss Place, Edinburgh.

== Second Boer War ==
Forty-five volunteers from 9th VB served in South Africa in the Second Boer War, some in Volunteer Service Companies of the Royal Scots. 2nd VSC served as 'M' (Volunteer) Company from May 1901 with 1st Royal Scots; and 3rd VSC as 'Q' Company from February 1902. Among them, Lieutenant James C.C. Broun "had the interesting experience of being the last officer to take a flag of truce into the enemy's lines, and of spending the last night of the war at the Head Government Laager of the Transvaal".

== Territorial Force ==
9th Royal Scots, nicknamed The Dandy Ninth, were the only Volunteer battalion to retain their number upon the transition to the Territorial Force in April 1908. In 1912 the battalion moved to Hepburn House (named after John Hepburn, founder of the Royal Scots), purpose-built headquarters at 89 East Claremont Street, Edinburgh. Half of the £7,000 cost was met by the Commanding Officer, James Clark.

== World War I ==
=== Mobilisation ===
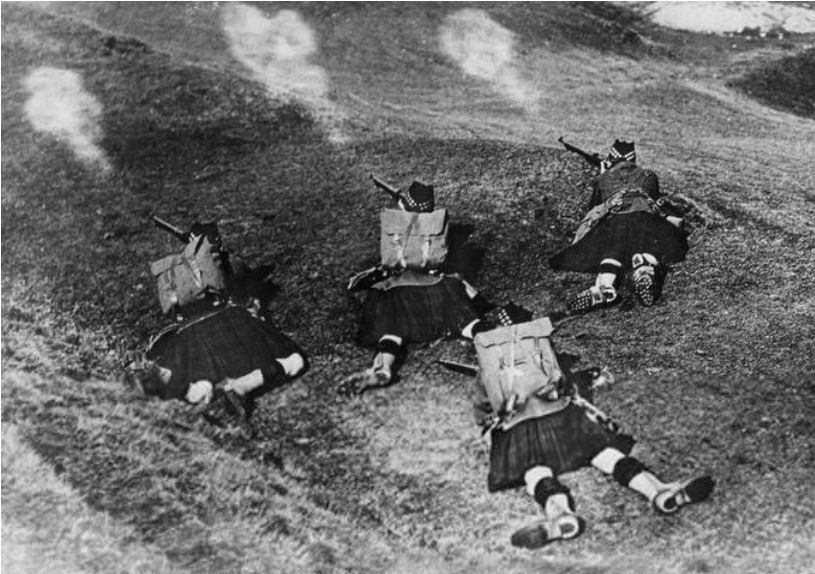
9th Royal Scots at training near Edinburgh, 1915

The 9th Royal Scots returned from their summer camp at Stobs on Sunday, 2 August 1914 and two days later they were embodied when Britain declared war on Germany. They served with Lothian Brigade, part of Scottish Coast Defences (Infantry). Among their duties they built and manned the Section No.3 defences of Edinburgh, provided guards at Redford Prisoner of War camp and also provided the machine-gun section for an armoured train.

=== 1/9th Royal Scots ===
The first-line 'Service' battalion 1/9th Royal Scots deployed to France on 24 February 1915 and joined 27th Division in the Ypres Salient. When chlorine gas was employed in the Second Battle of Ypres, 9th Royal Scots helped fill the gap on 23 April 1915. In March 1916 they transferred to the 51st (Highland) Division and served with them at High Wood, Beaumont-Hamel, Arras, Third Ypres and Cambrai. They were sent to strengthen the 61st (2nd South Midland) Division in February 1918 and faced the German spring offensives at St Quentin (Operation Michael) and at the Lys. They moved again in June 1918, this time to the 15th (Scottish) Division, and served near Soissons, where the battalion suffered its heaviest loss of the war at Villemontoire on 1 August 1918. In the Hundred Days Offensive, the 1/9th Royal Scots captured Vendin-le-Vieil on 12 October 1918, and advanced into Belgium. They were serving with the division when the Armistice was signed.

=== 2/9th Royal Scots ===
The second-line 2/9th Battalion was raised in September 1914. They moved to Essex in February 1916 and then on to Ireland in January 1917, where they were disbanded and the headquarters were closed on 15 May 1918.

=== 3/9th Royal Scots ===
In June 1915 the third-line 3/9th Battalion was formed at Peebles to train new recruits. On 1 September 1916 it became part of the Lowland Reserve Brigade at Catterick Camp. All of the third-line battalions of the regiment were amalgamated to become 4th (Reserve) Battalion, The Royal Scots in July 1917 at Catterick.

== Amalgamation ==
Edinburgh's Territorial battalions were reassigned, disbanded or amalgamated with the formation of the Territorial Army (TA) in 1921. 7th (Leith) and 9th (Highlanders) Royals Scots were amalgamated to create 7th/9th Royal Scots. They remained at Hepburn House, retained the kilt and were commanded by officers who had served with 9th Royal Scots. In the Second World War the 7th/9th Royal Scots served as part of the Second BEF in 1940 and in North West Europe 1944-45. They played a notable part in Operation Infatuate, the capture of Walcheren in November 1944.

== Uniform ==
In Review Order, 1900, the uniform consisted of a glengarry of Royal Scots pattern, a scarlet doublet with royal blue facings and a kilt of Hunting Stewart tartan. Khaki Service Dress was introduced in 1902.

== See also ==
- List of battalions of the Royal Scots

== External sources ==
- The Long, Long Trail
- The Royal Scots
- Audio recording of RWF Johnston
