= Walter Lyon (poet) =

Scottish poet

Walter Scott Stuart Lyon (North Berwick) (1 October 1886 – 8 May 1915) was a war poet during the First World War.

Son of Walter F. K. and Isabella R. Lyon, of Tantallon Lodge, North Berwick, Scotland, he was one of five brothers, three of whom were killed in the war and one of whom died while a student at Haileybury.

Walter went to Balliol College, Oxford and began a career as a Scottish Advocate.

He volunteered for the 9th Battalion, Royal Scots before the First World War and was sent to Belgium in February 1915, to the trenches near Glencose Wood outside Ypres. He served as a lieutenant. Soon after he wrote two poems, Easter at Ypres and Lines Written in a Fire Trench. A few weeks later while the Second Battle of Ypres was at its fiercest, he wrote two more poems, On a Grave in a Trench, which he inscribed "English killed for Patrie", and I Tracked a Dead Man Down a Trench.

In early May 1915 Walter Lyon and the Royal Scots were in dugouts in Potijze Wood near the Menin Road, just 200 yards from the firing line. The shelling was so fierce that trees were torn up by the roots and the tops sliced by shrapnel. The stream of wounded from the wood was continuous and Walter Lyon was among the dead. He has no known grave and his name is listed on the Menin Gate Memorial in Ypres, panel 11.

A collection of his poems was published in 1916 and two are included in an anthology of Public School War Poetry called "A Deep Cry" published in 1993.
