= National Reserve (United Kingdom) =

- Active: 1910–1916
- Country: United Kingdom
- Type: Army reserve

The National Reserve was created in 1910 as a means of retaining the option to call on the services of ex-military personnel to augment the regular and auxiliary military forces of the United Kingdom in the event of a major war. At its inception it was little more than a register of men with previous military experience who would be willing to return to arms should their services be required. The government refused to grant the reserve any funding, and until three weeks after the start of the First World War, could not definitively say how it would be used. On the outbreak of the war, many of the younger, fitter reservists re-enlisted in the British Army or Territorial Force on their own initiative, without waiting to be called up. When the reserve was finally called to duty, it was used to augment the home defence forces in the guarding of key installations and infrastructure. The older reservists, considered unfit for more active duties, played a leading role in the creation of the Volunteer Training Corps, a civilian auxiliary recruited from those ineligible for military service, largely on account of age. The introduction of conscription early in 1916 resulted in the younger reservists being called up for service in the army. The remaining reservists were transferred into the Royal Defence Corps, established in March 1916 as part of the re-organisation of the home defence forces, and the National Reserve effectively ceased to exist as a distinct organisation.

== Formation ==
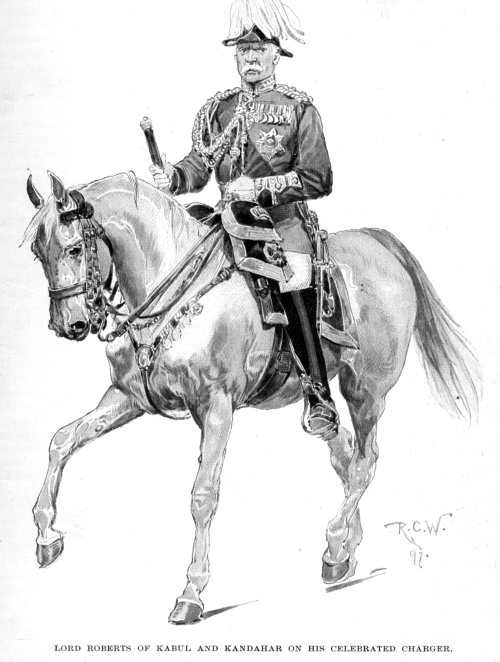
Lord Roberts, Colonel-in-Chief of the National Reserve.

The Veteran Reserve was officially established as part of the Territorial Force Reserve in 1910 by Richard Haldane, Secretary of State for War. Haldane was the architect of the Territorial Force and Special Reserve, and concerns that these two institutions were not adequate to defend the country against raids or invasion prompted the establishment of the Veteran Reserve. In its conception, the Veteran Reserve was to be administered by the same County Territorial Associations which administered the Territorial Force, and be recruited from ex-regular soldiers who had completed their time as army reservists. Haldane anticipated that it would provide some 10,000 men who could reinforce the Special Reserve. At its inception, recruitment into the Veteran Reserve was expanded to include almost anyone with military experience, including former members of the Volunteer Force, Militia, Territorial Force and Special Reserve, and anyone who could present a war medal as proof of past military service. While the Territorial Force Reserve itself was a failure – its strength in 1914 was 880 all ranks, from a potential 105,000 eligible former territorials – the Veteran Reserve proved to be highly popular, with 200,000 men registered in 1914. The former Commander-in-Chief of the Forces, Lord Roberts, was appointed Colonel-in-Chief, and in August 1911 the name was changed to National Reserve.

The National Reserve was little more than a register of eligible men willing to offer their services should the need arise. Although the reserve's supporters favoured an active role in the nation's defence scheme, Haldane was anxious not to incur any additional costs. He refused to make any commitments as to how the reservists would be utilised, or even whether they would be equipped by the government. In line with Haldane's concern, the War Office refused to sanction uniforms for National Reservists. It insisted that a buttonhole badge was enough to comply with the Hague Convention on recognition of combatants, and only reluctantly permitted officers to wear the uniforms of their former corps on ceremonial occasions. The War Office also refused to allocate funds for musketry practice for the first three years of the National Reserve's existence, and relied instead on reservists' membership of the National Rifle Association to maintain proficiency. There was no public funding for National Reserve facilities; clubs and permanent facilities were established independently, and such facilities served to give the reserve a physical presence in the local community and helped with recruitment.

The initial regulations stated that reservists' specific duties would be decided after consultation with local constabularies, and the intent was that they would clear livestock from likely invasion areas and guard vulnerable points in the national infrastructure. A more active role for younger reservists in reinforcing the regular army or the Territorial Force in home defence was only hinted at. Revised regulations issued in November 1911 re-affirmed the National Reserve as primarily a register of trained men with no further military obligation, but also stated that they might be utilised "either for active duties with the home defence forces or for other services". The regulations also categorised reservists in three classes according to age and fitness for combat duties, and this classification system was refined in a further revision to the regulations in 1913. Class I reservists comprised officers and other ranks who were passed medically fit for active service at home or overseas. Class II reservists comprised officers and senior non-commissioned officers (NCO) under 55 and other ranks under 50 who were fit enough for combat duty in garrisons or for administrative work at home. Both classes were populated by reservists who accepted an 'honourable obligation' to be liable for service in times of imminent danger, for which they would receive a gratuity of £10 (Class I) or £5 (Class II) on mobilisation. The regulations indicated the duties National Reservists might be asked to perform – reinforcement of the regular army, bringing garrisons and home army units up to strength, guarding vulnerable points and "other military duties" in threatened areas – but fell short of establishing a definite liability. A third class was sub-divided into three sections, two for reservists who could be categorised in Classes I and II but who declined to accept the obligation, and a third accommodating those too old or unfit to be considered as anything other than honorary members to be retained for "social and influential purposes". The strength of the National Reserve as at 1 October 1913 was 215,000 of all ranks.

The classification revealed that of the 200,000 registered reservists in 1914, only some 14,000 were categorised as Class I and 46,000 as Class II. Of these, only a third were ex-regular army, the remainder having served their military apprenticeship in the less-proficient auxiliaries. Given that even a former regular soldier would require extensive refresher training to return to a standard of efficiency that would allow him to retake his place in a front-line combat unit, there was considerable doubt about the National Reserve's effectiveness as a true reserve. Haldane's successor as Secretary of State for War, John Seely, nevertheless identified the Class I and Class II reservists as the means of addressing the shortfalls in the under-strength Special Reserve and Territorial Force respectively. This was a grave error, according to Lord Esher, chairman of the London County Territorial Association. He regarded the National Reserve as a distinct force with its own specific function, and its use to make up shortfalls in the Territorial Force would undermine efforts to resolve significant problems then being experienced in recruiting for that force. The Council of County Territorial Associations called for a better definition of the National Reserve's purpose, and the confusion about its function was echoed by the Kent association which, having registered 7,350 Class I and II reservists, minuted that "it is understood that the Government intend to make use of this force in some manner, but nothing is yet known except for reports appearing in the papers".

== First World War ==
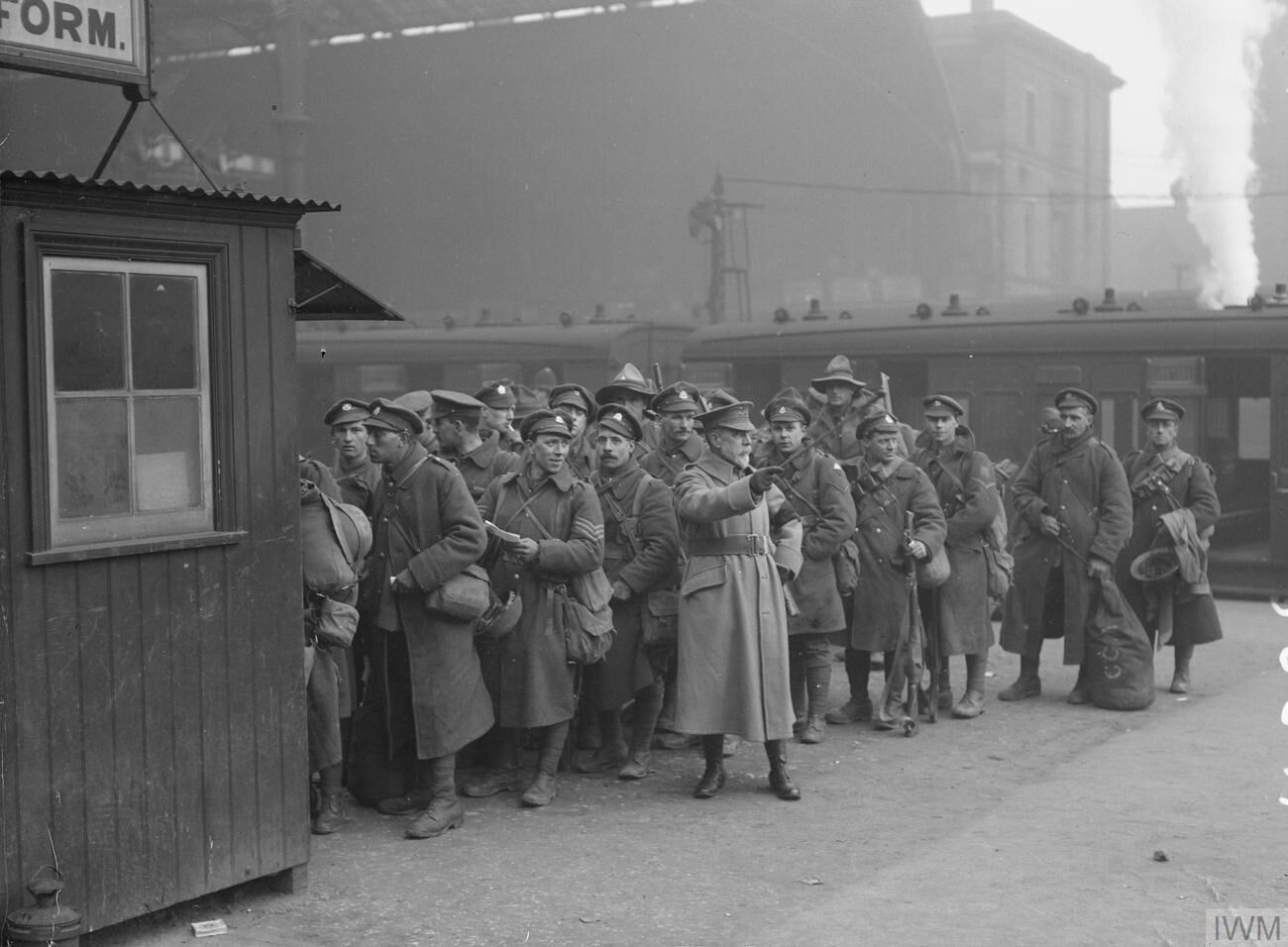
A member of the Volunteer Training Corps directing troops arriving on leave at Victoria Station

Procrastination about the role the National Reserve would perform in a crisis continued until the end of the second week of the First World War. Even then, it took a review by Harold Tennant, the Under-Secretary of State for War, and a false start before it was finally decided how the National Reserve would be utilised. Ex-regular and NCO members of Classes I and II under the age of 42 were invited to join the New Army as NCOs. Other members in both classes up to the same age limit were encouraged to join regimental reserves then being formed, while Class II members over 42 years old were told to enlist in their local Territorial Force unit. Class II reservists who did not wish to transfer out of the National Reserve but who nevertheless offered their services were uniformed, armed and attached to Territorial Force units to guard vulnerable points. Now that there was, three weeks into the war, some clarity about how the National Reserve was to be used, reservists were called up, though they were under no legal obligation to respond.

Several thousand of the first two classes had not waited to be called, and had already joined regular or territorial units on their own initiative; many ex-regulars among them soon found themselves drafted, via the Special Reserve battalions in which they had enlisted, to their regiment's front-line battalions fighting in France. The regimental depots experienced some difficulties processing the huge numbers of men volunteering for service generally, but the Hertfordshire Territorial Association, for example, was able to claim that practically all its Class I and II reservists were with their regiments by mid September. In November, Tennant reported that the majority of the first two classes had enlisted, though there were concerns that, on the one hand not enough work could be found for them, and on the other there were still some who had not yet enlisted. The latter were warned in December that the government was considering withdrawing the bounty and removing them from the register.

With such a high workload, the question of how the older, Class III reservists could be employed was generally given a low priority by both the government and the County Territorial Associations whose task it was to process them. Local authorities and businesses could request the services of Class III reservists as guards, for which they were expected to pay the government. These reservists would then also be attached to the local territorial unit, but would receive only a brassard in lieu of a uniform and not be armed. The Buckinghamshire association led the way in anticipating what the government had anyway indicated would be a likely role, and started forming what would in October officially become Protection Companies to guard vulnerable locations. Other Class III reservists patrolled on their own initiative without arms or official sanction. Many senior reservists played leading roles in the development of the Volunteer Training Corps (VTC), raised from and by civilians ineligible for service in the military, largely on account of age. Those Class III reservists who had not been assigned any duties found they were readily accepted into the VTC, where they lent the enthusiastic but unofficial organisation an element of martial respectability.

As increasing numbers of National Reservists answered the call to service, they were put to work, freeing up the Territorial Force in the guarding of vulnerable points. By September, 40 reservists were part of the garrison at Dover, 136 were patrolling the Manchester Ship Canal and 120 were at or near Lowestoft on the Suffolk coast. The next month, over 2,000 reservists were guarding strategic sites around London, another 600 had joined home defence forces at the Tyneside shipyards and munitions works, and Buckinghamshire provided a company of three officers and 117 other ranks for railway protection. Railway Protection Companies received the lowest priority in equipment, and in November the War Office could only state an aspiration that even half of the reservists so employed might be issued with weapons. As there was no intention to deploy Class III reservists for combat duties, the War Office refused to provide them with uniforms, prompting the Huddersfield reservists to adopt bowler hats to lend themselves some semblance of uniformity. Even when reservists were entitled to wear uniform, there were difficulties in supplying them to men who were more portly than those for which the standard issue, assuming there was any left in the stores, had been designed; more than one Territorial Association found it necessary to commission specially tailored uniforms. Those reservists without uniforms were issued with scarlet armbands inscribed with "National Reserve". Other shortfalls were made up by 'comfort committees', which provided boots and mufflers as increasing numbers of men took up guard duties over the winter.

In 1915, those Class II reservists under the age of 44 who could march ten miles with rifle and 150 rounds of ammunition were invited to volunteer for garrison duties overseas. Those who did were transferred from the Protection Companies to seven new Territorial Force Provisional Battalions, raised as units of the Rifle Brigade. The Protection Companies were renamed as Supernumerary Companies of the Territorial Force, and the remaining Class III reservists for which no duties had been assigned were formally released to the VTC. To address the difficulties of managing a home defence force that was also the means by which the front-line forces overseas were reinforced, Field Marshal Sir John French, Commander-in-Chief, Home Forces, created the Royal Defence Corps (RDC) in March 1916. As part of this re-organisation of the home forces, the Supernumerary Companies became once again known as Protection Companies, each between 150 and 250 all ranks. They became part of the RDC, and responsibility for them was taken from the individual territorial associations and concentrated under the control of the City of London Territorial Association. The Military Service Acts which introduced conscription two months earlier meant that those reservists who proved reluctant to transfer into the new corps could be compelled to do so. Those reservists who became liable for service overseas as a result of the Act were replaced by Class III reservists who, as fit men between the ages of 41 and 60, qualified for enlistment into the RDC.

The changes marked the end of the National Reserve as a distinct entity, and by early 1918 all links with that organisation had been lost. The RDC was disbanded in 1919, its former National Reservists receiving a demobilisation gratuity, as did those who had joined the Territorial Force Provisional Battalions. The RDC was reconstituted in 1922 as the National Defence Corps, but hopes that the National Reserve would also be revived were dashed.

== Bibliography ==
- Mitchinson, K. W. (2005). Defending Albion: Britain's Home Army 1908-1919. London: Palgrave Macmillan. ISBN 9781403938251.
- Mitchinson, K. W. (2008). England's Last Hope: The Territorial Force, 1908–1914. London: Palgrave Macmillan. ISBN 9780230574540.
