= William Green (British Army officer, born 1882) =

British general (1882–1947)

Major-General William Green CB DSO**
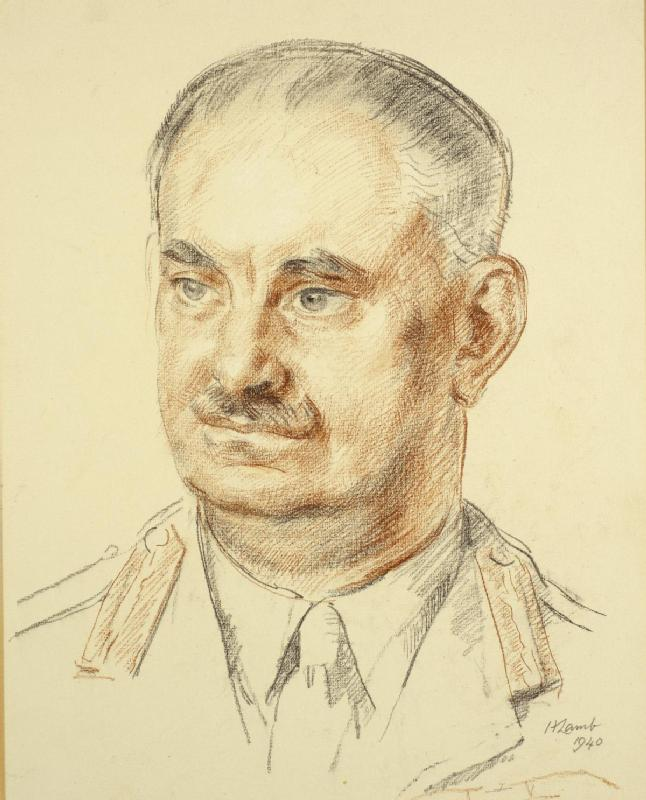
- A sketch of Green by Henry Lamb, 1940
- Born: 1 August 1882
- Died: 4 December 1947 (aged 65); Farnborough, Hampshire, England
- Military career
- Allegiance: United Kingdom
- Branch: British Army
- Service years: 1900–1940
- Rank: Major-General
- Unit: Black Watch
- Commands: South-Western Area (1938–40); 9th Infantry Brigade (1933–35); 2nd Battalion, Loyal Regiment (North Lancashire) (1928–31); 1/6th Battalion, Royal Highlanders (1919); 153rd Infantry Brigade (1918–19); 9th Battalion, Royal Scots (1916–18)
- Conflicts: Second Boer War; First World War; Second World War
- Awards: Companion of the Order of the Bath; Distinguished Service Order & Two Bars; Mentioned in Despatches (5); Officer of the Legion of Honour (France); Croix de Guerre (Belgium)

Major-General William Green, CB, DSO & Two Bars (1 August 1882 – 4 December 1947) was a senior officer in the British Army.

== Early life ==
William Green was born on 1 August 1882, the son of Colonel Sir William Green (1836–1897). In 1914, he married Lesley Kathleen, daughter of Guy Hannaford; they had one daughter.

== Military career ==
Following schooling at Fettes College in Edinburgh and the Royal Military College, Sandhurst, Green was commissioned as a second lieutenant in the Black Watch on 11 August 1900. Promoted to lieutenant on 12 November 1901, he served with the 1st Battalion in the Second Boer War between 1901 and 1902, earning the Queen's South Africa Medal with four clasps. He stayed in South Africa until the war ended in June 1902, and returned home on the SS Kinfauns Castle in October that year. In November 1907, he was promoted to captain and between May 1908 and February 1912, he was an adjutant in the Territorial Force.

Green served in the First World War, and was posted in France and Belgium three times (August to October 1914, December 1914 to May 1915, and April 1916 to November 1918). Promoted to major on 1 September 1915, he was posted as the brigade major of the Home Forces between November 1915 and April 1916. He was then transferred to the 9th Battalion of the Royal Scots as a temporary major, before promotion to be temporary lieutenant-colonel two months later. He was a brigade commander in France from 15 April 1918. Green had been wounded twice during the war, and was mentioned in despatches five times. He received the Distinguished Service Order with two bars, the first of which was gazetted in January 1918, the Belgian Croix de Guerre and the French Legion of Honour (4th Class).

On New Years Day 1919, Green was promoted to brevet lieutenant colonel. After completing a two-year course at the Staff College, Camberley, in 1920, he was appointed a general staff officer in the Defence Force (April to July 1921) and then the London District (July 1921 to December 1922). On 1 January 1923, he was appointed an instructor at the Senior Officers School in Woking, where he stayed until September 1925. From 1928 to 1931 he commanded the 2nd Battalion of the Loyal Regiment (North Lancashire). On 2 February 1928, he was promoted to substantive lieutenant colonel and, on 1 July 1931, he was promoted to colonel (with seniority from 1 January 1923) and appointed a general staff officer, grade 1 (GSO1) with Scottish Command. Having served there for two years, he was appointed commander of the 9th Infantry Brigade on 21 July 1933 and was granted the temporary rank of brigadier (brigadier having replaced the former rank of brigadier general) whilst so employed. He was promoted to major-general on 1 March 1935 and went on half-pay on 1 June after vacating command of the brigade. He returned to full pay in March 1938, when he was appointed a commander of the South-Western Area. He was appointed a Companion of the Order of the Bath in 1937 and retired from the army in 1940, shortly after the outbreak of the Second World War, and died on 4 December 1947, at the age of 65, in Farnborough, Hampshire.

== Freemasonry ==
Green was a Scottish Freemason having been Initiated in The Lodge of Holyrood House (St Luke's), No.44, (Edinburgh, Scotland) on 16 March 1908.

== Likenesses ==
- William Green by Bassano Ltd, 28 February 1928. Whole-plate glass negative. National Portrait Gallery, London (Photographs Collection, NPG x124259; given by Bassano & Vandyk Studios, 1974).
- William Green by Walter Stoneman, 1935. Bromide print, 7 ^{1}/_{2} in. x 4 ^{5}/_{8} in. (189 mm × 116 mm). Commissioned, 1935. National Portrait Gallery, London (Photographs Collection NPG x167947).

== Bibliography ==
- Smart, Nick (2005). Biographical Dictionary of British Generals of the Second World War. Barnsley, South Yorkshire: Pen and Sword Books. ISBN 1844150496.
