= Arthur Farrimond =

British distance runner

- Arthur Farrimond.

Personal information
- Nationality: British
- Born: 30 September 1893 Hindley, Lancashire, England
- Died: 14 November 1978 (aged 85) Hindley, Greater Manchester, England

Sport
- Sport: Long-distance running
- Event: Marathon

Arthur Farrimond (30 September 1893 – 14 November 1978) was a noted athlete in the early part of the 20th century, eventually competing for Great Britain in the marathon in the 1924 Olympic Games.

== Early years ==
Arthur Farrimond was born to James and Margaret Farrimond at Hill Street in Hindley, Lancashire.

He won his first race at the age of seventeen at the Westhoughton town sports in 1910. He joined the Bolton club then Leigh Harriers in 1911. In February 1914, he became a medal winner in the Junior East-Lancashire cross country championships.

== First World War ==
When the First World War broke out he enlisted in the 9th Royal Scots on 11 November 1914. While serving in France he won the French medallion in a 1½ mile race for his regiment. He reached the front line in January 1915 where he was wounded in the knee; he was again wounded in the stomach in August 1916 as a result of a bayonet charge, and made a full recovery while in Merry Flatts Hospital, Govan, in Glasgow.

In March 1915, one of his letters home was published in the local newspaper, speaking of his ordeal in the trenches and also saying he had made up his mind to try to get to Berlin in 1916 for the Olympic Games, but unknown to him, there would be no 1916 Summer Games and he would not resume his training until 1919, too late even for the 1920 Summer Olympics.

== Post-war athletic career ==
Farrimond married Emily Birch in 1922 and also regained his running fitness after the war and was becoming well known as a distance runner. He was second in the 1923 and 1924 Manchester marathons, and it was from these races that he was selected to run for Britain in the marathon in the 1924 Paris Olympics.

Farrimond finished 17th in Paris and had to suffer the last few miles with a twist of his ankle, which he received trying to avoid a civilian who insisted on running alongside him.

== Later life ==
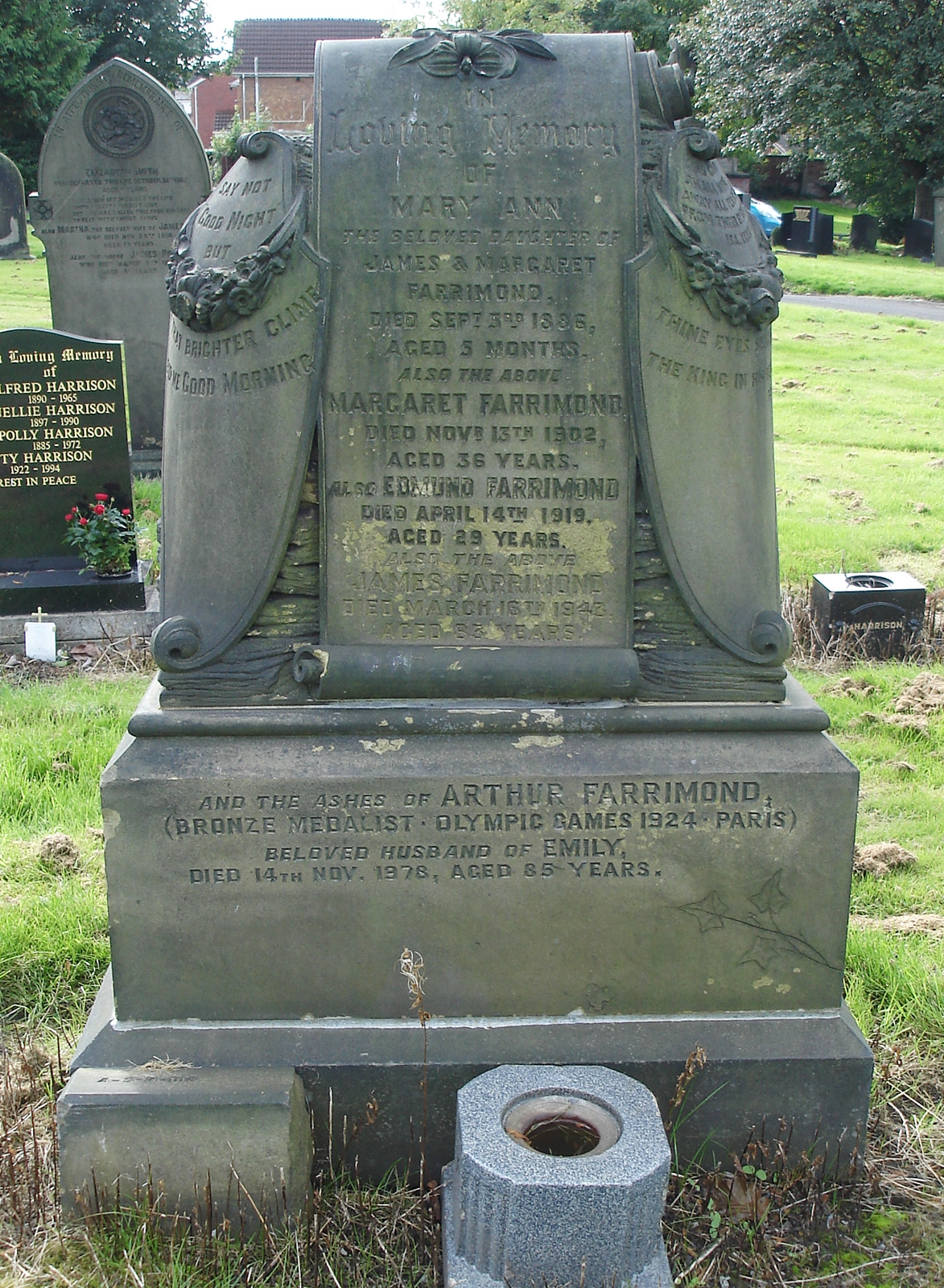
Farrimond family grave, Hindley Cemetery

Farrimond returned home to his job as an electrician in the employment of the Wigan Coal and Iron Company. He continued to run in races for the next fifty years with the club.

In later years, Farrimond ran a newsagent's shop at Hindley. He died at the age of 85, and his ashes were placed in the family grave at Hindley Cemetery. His wife Emily died in 1984 aged ninety; they had no children.
