= 5th Volunteer Battalion, Royal Scots =

5th Volunteer Battalion, The Royal Scots
- Active: 1859 - 1908
- Country: United Kingdom
- Branch: British Army
- Type: Reserve Infantry
- Role: Infantry Reserve Support
- Size: Battalion and 12 Companies
- Garrison/HQ: Leith
- Engagements: South Africa 1900 - 1902

Commanders
- Honorary Colonel: R. C. Maclagan, VD.

The 5th Volunteer Battalion was a Volunteer Force battalion of the Royal Scots that existed from 1859 - 1908. It participated in The Second Boer War and gained its one and only battle honour from that war.

== History ==
The 5th Volunteer Battalion can trace its history to August 6, 1859 when 153 men from Leith created two new rifle companies and in December became known as the "1st Mid-Lothian (Leith) Rifle Volunteer Corps" with four companies. In 1863 the 4th Mid-Lothian (Corstorphine) Rifle Volunteer Corps amalgamated with the regiment and formed the new 9th, 10th, and 11th Companies. In 1884 the regiment was re-organized and reduced to 10 Companies. Later in 1888 it joined the Royal Scots as the 5th Volunteer Battalion. During the South African War 196 of its members served with the Royal Scots where Captain Campbell and Corporal T. H. Greg gained the Mentioned in dispatches and later the Distinguished Conduct Medal. In No.3 company Private J. G. Lockhart gained another Mentioned in dispatches. After its disbandment and dispersion into the Territorial Force the battalion's traditions were kept up by the 5th, later 7th battalions.

== Structure 1868 ==
The regiment was at its highest strength in 1868 consisting of 12 companies:

- Headquarters - Leith Walk
  - No. 1 Company - Leith
  - No. 2 Company - Leith
  - No. 3 Company - Leith
  - No. 4 Company - Leith
  - No. 5 Company - Leith
  - No. 6 Company - Leith
  - No. 7 Company - Leith
  - No. 8 Company - Leith
  - No. 9 Company - Leith
  - No. 10 Company - Leith
  - No. 11 Company - Leith
  - Band of the 1st Mid-Lothian Rifle Volunteer Corps

A 10th Company also existed as a Cyclist company in 1901.
