= Home Service Battalions =

The Home Service Battalions were a force of the British Army in both the First and Second World Wars, intended for home defence and other duties. Those who joined these battalions were exempted from service outside of the United Kingdom.

== First World War ==
Before the outbreak of the First World War, volunteer reservists of the Territorial Force could not be ordered to serve outside of the United Kingdom, under the terms of the Territorial and Reserve Forces Act 1907. When hostilities commenced in August 1914, Territorial soldiers were asked to sign a document called the Imperial Service Obligation which waived their immunity from overseas service. By 26 September 1914, 72% of Territorials had signed; the remainder were consigned to second line battalions. New Territorial recruits continued to be able to enlist for home service only, until March 1915. The Military Service Act 1916 forced those under the age of 41 to sign the Imperial Service Obligation or resign.

As the Territorial regiments' first and second line battalions were prepared for active service, those who had opted for home service or were unfit were formed into Provisional Battalions that in turn formed the 71st, 72nd and 73rd Home Service Divisions. On 1 January 1917, the remaining Provisional battalions were renamed Home Service Territorial Battalions of the Infantry Regiments. In addition, regular army infantry soldiers who were too old or unfit to serve overseas were formed into (Home Service) Garrison Battalions, which became part of the Royal Defence Corps.

== Second World War ==
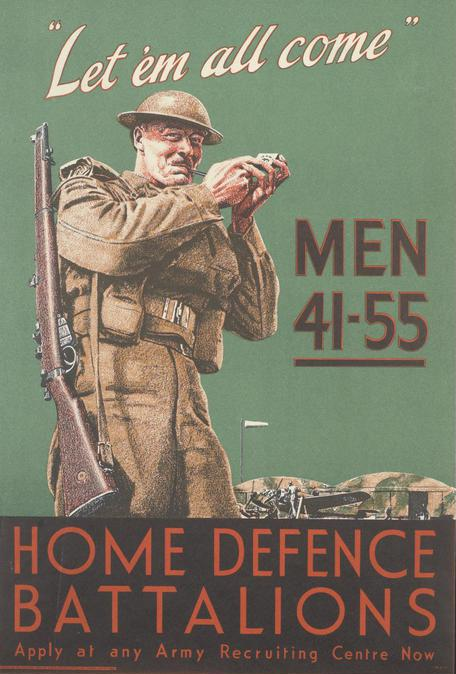
1939 Home Defence poster

During British re-armament in the mid-1930s, the Royal Defence Corps was disbanded and replaced by the National Defence Companies, a part-time force which was part of the Territorial Army (TA) and open to ex-servicemen between the ages of 45 and 60 years. The Defence Companies were mobilised during the week before war was declared, their role being the protection of "vulnerable points". In November 1939, two months after Britain's entry into the Second World War, the National Defence Companies were formed into battalions attached to Regular Army regiments and renamed "Home Service Battalions", to guard vulnerable points and prisoner of war (POW) camps in the United Kingdom.
