= Royal Defence Corps =

The Royal Defence Corps was a corps of the British Army formed in 1916 and disbanded in 1936.

As part of the reorganisation of home defence forces by Field Marshal Sir John French, Commander-in-Chief, Home Forces, the Royal Defence Corps was created to “...carry out duties connected with the local defence of the United Kingdom, including those hitherto performed by the Supernumerary Territorial Force Companies....." The role of the corps was thus to provide troops for security and guard duties inside the United Kingdom, guarding important locations such as ports, bridges and railways, as well as prisoner-of-war camps.

In addition to the Supernumerary Companies, 18 (Home Service) Garrison battalions of line infantry regiments became part of the RDC. Garrison battalions were composed of soldiers either too old or medically unfit for active front-line service; the Home Service status indicated they were unable to be transferred overseas. The corps was never intended to be employed on overseas service.

The RDC was organised into independent companies of men aged between 41 and 60. Protection Companies guarded infrastructure, while Observation Companies kept watch for enemy activity off the coast and in the skies. Uniform distinctions included a cap badge of the royal cipher and crown within a circlet formed by the words 'ROYAL DEFENCE CORPS' and a brass 'RDC' shoulder title. In April 1918 some 27,000 men were serving in the RDC. Of these, 14,000 were employed at prisoner of war camps.

The RDC was disbanded in 1919, before being reconstituted in 1922. It was finally disbanded in 1936, when its functions were taken over by the National Defence Companies of the Territorial Army.

== See also ==
- National Reserve 1910-1916 - predecessor of the RDC under various titles
- Volunteer Training Corps (World War I) 1914-1918 - a contemporaneous voluntary force performing similar functions
- National Defence Companies 1936-1939 - successor to the RDC in terms of role and function, part of the Territorial Army
- Home Service Battalions - units intended for home defence and other duties whose personnel were exempt from service outside of the United Kingdom.
