= National Defence Companies =

- Active: 1 September 1936
- Disbanded: 1939
- Country: United Kingdom
- Role: Defence from invasion

The National Defence Companies of the Territorial Army were a voluntary military reserve force of the British Army, for the purpose of home defence in the event of war. Enlistment was limited to former members of the British Armed Forces between the ages of 45 and 60. The scheme was established in 1936, during rearmament prior to World War II. On the outbreak of war in September 1939, the National Defence Companies were called up for service and became the basis of the Home Service Battalions.

== Establishment ==
After the end of World War I, responsibility for home defence on land rested with the Territorial Army and also the Royal Defence Corps which consisted of regular army soldiers who were too old or unfit for front line duties. With the rise of Nazi Germany during the 1930s, the government of the United Kingdom came under political pressure to modernise and re-equip the Armed Forces. As a part of that process, Duff Cooper, the Secretary of State for War, announced the disbandment of the Royal Defence Corps and the establishment of National Defence Companies that were to be a part of the Territorial Army. In a statement to the House of Commons on 21 July 1936, he said that the companies would be formed on a county or city basis, each being linked to their local Territorial battalion. Enlistment would start on 1 September of that year, and was open to "ex-members of His Majesty's Forces, normally between the ages of 45 and 60 years". Their role was stated to be "to protect important points in Great Britain when war is threatening or has actually broken out, but members of the force will not be called up until these conditions arise, nor will they be called up on account of civil disturbance". Cooper stated that the national establishment would be 8,450 officers and men, "and I have every confidence that I shall have no difficulty in securing this number of men in a very short time".

== Mobilisation ==
The National Defence Companies were mobilised on 25 and 26 August 1939, in the week before war was actually declared. In answer to a question in the House of Commons on 26 September, Leslie Hore-Belisha, the Secretary of State for War, said that he had "in contemplation a change in the present method of manning vulnerable points". On 3 October, Sir Victor Warrender, the Financial Secretary to the War Office, announced that recruitment to the companies was "not open at present". In November 1939, the National Defence Companies were formed into battalions attached to regular army regiments; renamed "Home Service Battalions", they would guard vulnerable points and Prisoner of War camps in the United Kingdom throughout the rest of the war.

== See also ==
- Home Service Force, a similar force raised in the 1980s
