= Volunteer Training Corps =

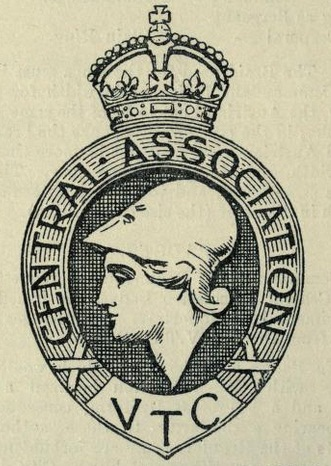
- Proficiency Badge of the Volunteer Training Corps, depicting the war goddess Bellona
- Active: September 1914 – December 1918
- Disbanded: January 1920
- Country: United Kingdom
- Role: Defence from invasion

Commanders
- Notable commanders: Prince Arthur, Duke of Connaught

The Volunteer Training Corps was a voluntary home defence reserve force in the United Kingdom during World War I.

== Early development ==
After war had been declared in August 1914, there was a popular demand for a means of service for those men who were over military age or those with business or family commitments which made it difficult for them to volunteer for the armed services. At this stage in the war, Britain relied entirely on a voluntary system of enlistment and many men still held to the Victorian principle that it was the task of professional troops to fight a war whilst the Militia, or Constitutional Force (which had converted from conscription to engaging volunteers for periods of service in the 1850s and was converted into the Special Reserve in 1908), Volunteer Force and Yeomanry (two volunteer forces, in which recruits did not engage for periods of service, that had amalgamated to form the Territorial Force in 1908, in which recruits voluntarily engaged for a period of service) provided for home defence, and civilian local defence groups began to spring up spontaneously as soon as war was declared.

The volunteer movement gained publicity from discourse in the press advocating civilian participation in home defence, with notable proponents being Arthur Conan Doyle and H. G. Wells. The first elements of central organisation were established by the formation of the London Volunteer Defence Force. Discussions about the nature and role of the movement ranged from simply drilling volunteers in preparation for their enlistment into the regular or home armies, through augmenting the home army's defence of vulnerable points, to providing a force that would actively oppose an invasion with guerrilla warfare. Concerned that such a body would undermine recruitment into the regular army and hinder more than help home defence, the War Office banned the movement.

Despite official antipathy, civilians continued to organise themselves, and Harold Tennant, Under-Secretary of State for War, realised that the government could do little to prevent them. Rather than allow the movement to grow unchecked, he decided in September to allow the Central Committee of the London Volunteer Defence Force to continue. Until the War Office had the time and resources to devote to the movement itself, the Central Committee, adopting the name Central Association of Volunteer Training Corps (VTC), became the body to which individual corps could affiliate, and was responsible for drawing up the rules and regulations on a national basis. Lord Desborough became the President of the Association and General Sir O'Moore Creagh VC was appointed the Military Advisor. In November, the association was officially recognised as the administrative body of the VTC and formally subjected to conditions which prevented interference with recruitment into the regular army, barred members from holding military rank or wearing uniforms other than an armband and denied any state funding.

Ex-military personnel of the National Reserve played a leading role in the growth of the VTC, providing many of its recruits and lending the nascent organisation an element of martial respectability. Among the many new corps formed were the United Arts Rifles – which numbered in its ranks the Poet Laureate, Robert Bridges – a unit of deaf mutes which drilled by sign language, and a unit that went by the name of the Ju Jitsu VTC. In May 1915, corps began to be organised into county regiments. Some 2,000 individual corps had appeared by June 1915, numbering 590,000 volunteers. Units raised finances for the purchase of weapons by charging membership fees. Amid concerns that they would compete with the established forces for the limited amount of rifles then available – in October 1915, there were 570,600 in the country for the 1.3 million men who needed them – the government prohibited volunteers from buying service rifles and required any purchase to be first cleared with the local military authority. Those corps which could not afford weapons begged or borrowed wherever they could, and dummy rifles, air guns and weapons loaned by the Church Lads' Brigade were among those pressed into service by various units.

Demand for the services of the VTC increased, and members were employed as guards by the Admiralty on the Scilly Isles, at the many new munitions works and on the rail network. Volunteers also dug trenches around London and assisted in bringing in the harvest. The movement grew out of the same spirit of volunteer service that gave birth to the Volunteer Force in the second half of the previous century, and a private member's bill introduced in the House of Lords in October 1915 sought to revive the Volunteer Act 1863 (26 & 27 Vict. c. 65) as an attempt to place the VTC on a more official footing. It was supported by General Sir Horace Smith-Dorrien, commander of the Central Force First Army, who, in a letter to The Times, wrote of "the most valuable aid the VTC are giving me". The bill failed due to government fears that it would complicate the home rule issue in Ireland by recognising the Ulster Volunteers and the Irish Volunteers. The VTC officially remained unrecognised and outside of the nation's home defence scheme, thus depriving members of legal protection in the performance of their duties. There was some doubt that the armband would be recognised by the enemy as uniform, leaving members vulnerable to execution as francs-tireurs, and when it was suggested that the VTC might guard prisoners of war, it was pointed out that, technically, a volunteer could be hanged for murder if he shot an escapee.

== Official recognition ==
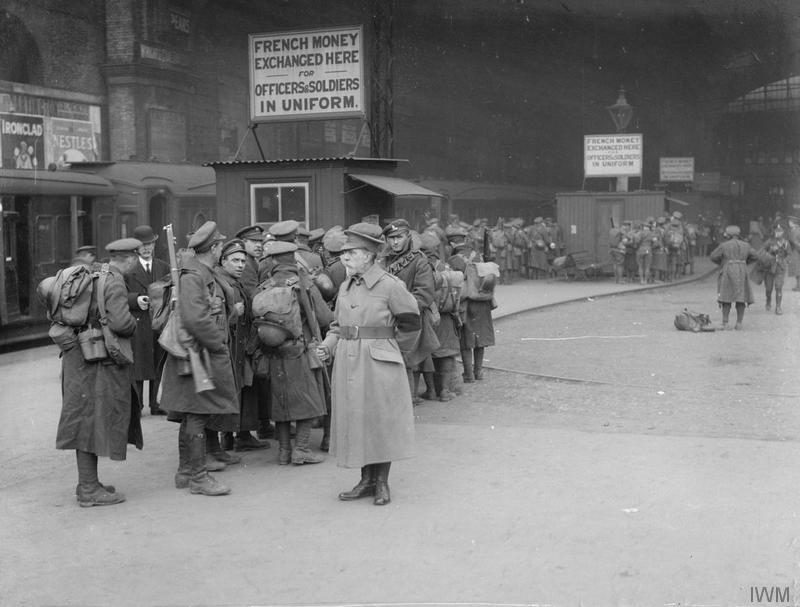
A Volunteer of the City of London VTC or "National Guard" assists regular soldiers to find their way around Victoria Station in London, one of many auxiliary tasks undertaken by the VTC.

When it was discovered that the Volunteer Act 1863 (26 & 27 Vict. c. 65) had never been repealed, it was used in April 1916 to legitimise the movement. VTC Battalions legally became Volunteer Regiments of the new 'Volunteer Force'. Eventually, they were allowed to wear khaki uniforms and equipment began to be officially supplied. In July 1918, the War Office decided to include the VTC Battalions into the County Infantry Regiment system, and they became numbered "Volunteer" battalions of their local regiment. With the introduction of conscription in 1916, came the power of the Military Service Tribunals to order men to join the VTC; however, the clause in the 1863 act which allowed resignation after fourteen days' notice initially made this unenforceable, so a Volunteer Act 1916 was passed which obliged members to remain in the Corps until the end of the war. By February 1918, there were 285,000 Volunteers, 101,000 of whom had been directed to the Corps by the Tribunals.

== Equipment, training and role ==
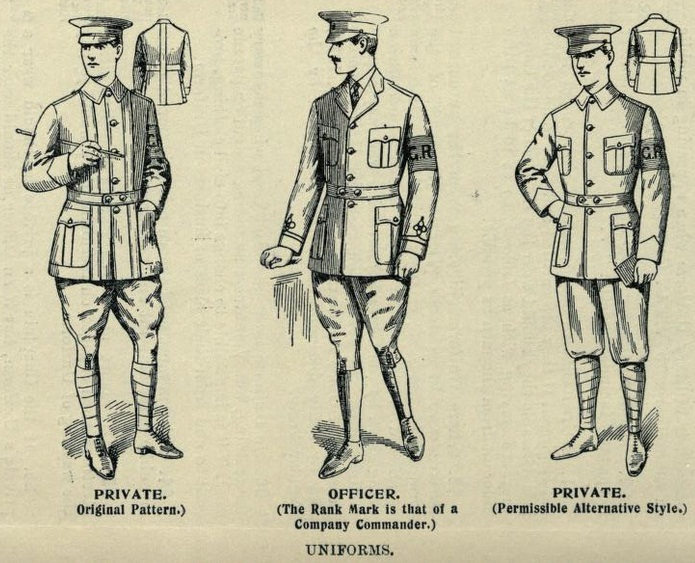
The Approved Volunteer Training Corps uniforms, published in February 1915

During 1917, P.14 Enfield Rifles began to be issued, followed by Hotchkiss Mk I machine guns. The Corps trained in drill and, if the equipment was available, use of the rifle. In case of a German invasion, battalions were tasked with roles such as line of communication defence and forming the garrison of major towns; 42 battalions were to defend London. Volunteers undertook a wide range of other tasks including; guarding vulnerable points, munitions handling, digging anti-invasion defence lines, assisting with harvesting, fire fighting and transport for wounded soldiers. In north Worcestershire some units helped to man anti-aircraft guns ringing Birmingham. In 1918, when there was an acute shortage of manpower because of the German spring offensive, c.7,000 Volunteers undertook three-month coast defence duties in East Anglia. The force was sometimes ridiculed by the public; there were jokes that the "GR" on their armbands stood for "George's Wrecks", "Grandpa's Regiment", "Genuine Relics", "Gorgeous Wrecks" or "Government Rejects".

== The Easter Rising in Dublin ==
The only time that Volunteer Training Corps men were engaged in actual combat, was in the Easter Rising in Dublin starting on Easter Monday, 24 April 1916. Some 120 members of the 1st (Dublin) Battalion, Associated Volunteer Training Corps were returning from field exercises at Ticknock, when they heard the news of the uprising. The commanding officer, Major Harris, decided to march to Beggars Bush Barracks. They carried rifles but were without ammunition or bayonets. They were fired on by a party of Irish Volunteers from a railway bridge. Part of the VTC force entered the barracks by the front gate, others made their way to the rear and scaled the wall. About 40 men at the rear of the column were pinned down by fire from surrounding houses and four were killed, including the first-class cricketer, Francis Browning, who had been second-in-command. The VTC men then assisted the small garrison of regular soldiers to hold the barracks for eight days. In total, five members of the battalion were killed and seven wounded.

== Disbandment ==
The Volunteer Training Corps was suspended in December 1918, and officially disbanded in January 1920, with the exception of the Volunteer Motor Corps which was retained until April 1921 in case of civil disorder.

== See also ==
- Home Guard (United Kingdom)
- Women's Defence Relief Corps

== Bibliography ==
- Beckett, Ian Frederick William (2004). A Nation in Arms. Barnsley, South Yorkshire: Pen & Sword Military. ISBN 9781844680238.
- Mitchinson, K. W. (2005). Defending Albion: Britain's Home Army 1908–1919. London: Palgrave Macmillan. ISBN 9781403938251.
