= British Army during the First World War =

The British Army during the First World War fought the largest and most costly war in its long history. Unlike the French and German Armies, the British Army was made up exclusively of volunteers, as opposed to conscripts, at the beginning of the conflict. Furthermore, the British Army was considerably smaller than its French and German counterparts. During the First World War, there were four distinct British armies. The first comprised approximately 247,000 soldiers of the regular army, over half of whom were posted overseas to garrison the British Empire, supported by some 210,000 reserves and a potential 60,000 additional reserves.

This component formed the backbone of the British Expeditionary Force (BEF), which was formed for service in France and became known as the Old Contemptibles. The second army was provided by the approximately 246,000-strong Territorial Force, initially allocated to home defence but used to reinforce the BEF after the regular army suffered heavy losses in the opening battles of the war. The third army was Kitchener's Army, which was composed of men who answered Lord Kitchener's call for volunteers in 1914–1915 and went into action at the Battle of the Somme in 1916. The fourth army was the reinforcement of existing formations with conscripts after the introduction of compulsory service in January 1916.

By the end of 1918, the British Army had reached its maximum strength of 3,820,000 men and could field over 70 divisions, this included about 1,500,000 from the British Indian Army. The vast majority of the British Army fought in the main theatre of war on the Western Front in France and Belgium against the German Empire. Some units were engaged in Italy and Salonika against Austria-Hungary and the Bulgarian Army, while other units fought in the Middle East, Africa and Mesopotamia, mainly against the Ottoman Empire, and one battalion fought alongside the Japanese Army in China during the Siege of Tsingtao.

The war also posed problems for the army commanders, given that, prior to 1914, the largest formation any serving general in the BEF had commanded on operations was a division. The expansion of the British Army saw some officers promoted from brigade to corps commander in less than a year. Army commanders also had to cope with the new tactics and weapons that were developed. With the move from manoeuvre to trench warfare, both the infantry and the artillery had to learn how to work together. During an offensive, and when in defence, they learned how to combine forces to defend the front line. Later in the war, when the Machine Gun Corps and the Tank Corps were added to the order of battle, they were also included in the new tactical doctrine.

The men at the front had to struggle with supply problems—there was a shortage of food and disease was rife in the damp, rat-infested conditions. Along with enemy action, many soldiers had to contend with new diseases: trench foot, trench fever and trench nephritis. When the war ended in November 1918, British Army casualties, as the result of enemy action and disease, were recorded as 673,375 killed and missing, with another 1,643,469 wounded. The rush to demobilise at the end of the conflict substantially decreased the strength of the British Army, from its peak strength of 3,820,000 men in 1918 to 370,000 men by 1920.

== Organization ==
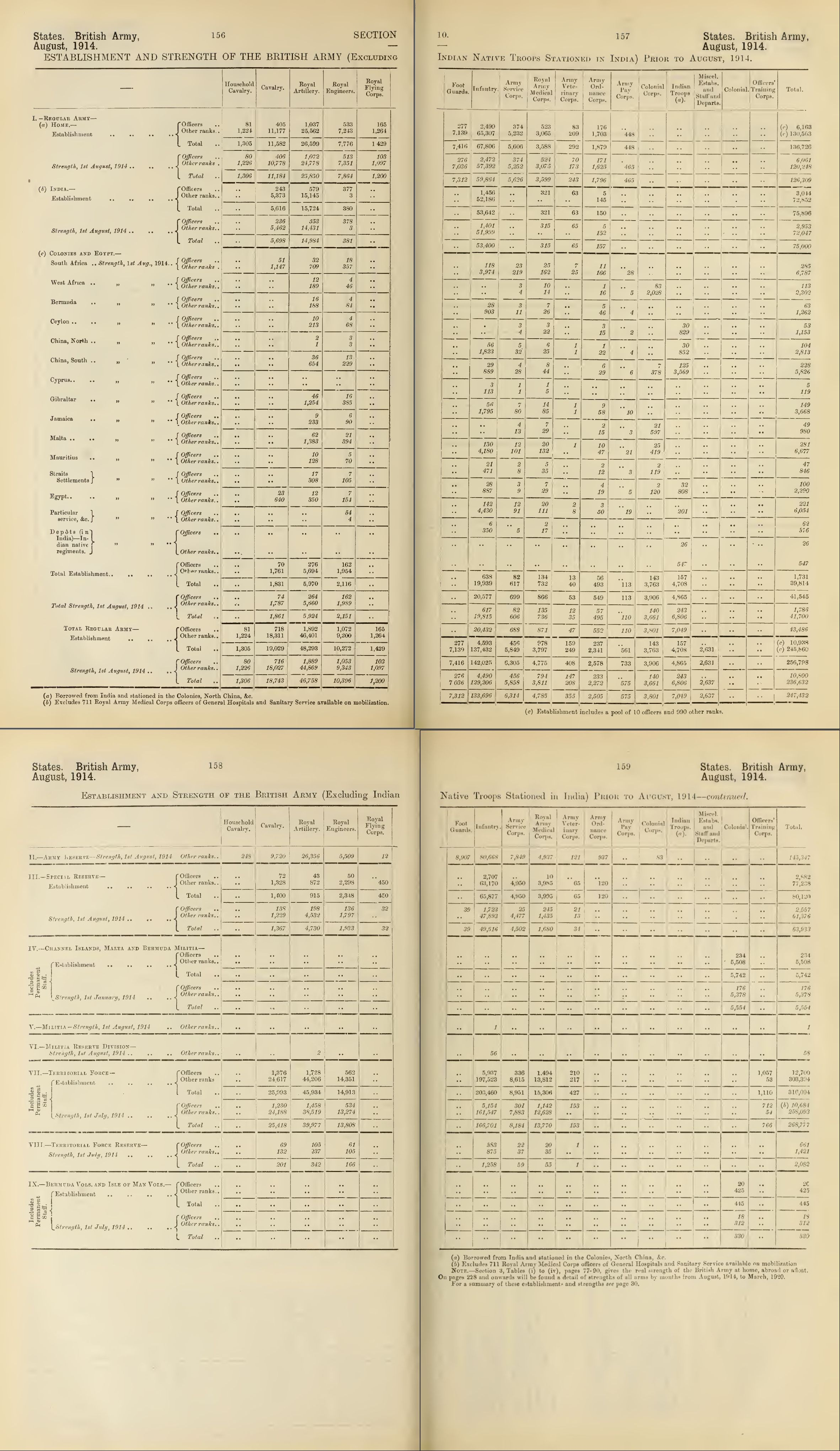
Establishment and Strength of the British Army (excluding Indian native troops stationed in India) prior to August, 1914.

By the First World War, the British military forces (i.e., those raised in British territory, whether in the British Isles or colonies, and also those raised in the Channel Islands, but not the British Indian Army, the military forces of the Dominions, or those of British protectorates) was still a complex of organisations, and not strictly a single force under a single administration. What is connoted by the term "British Army", consequently, is subject to the context, although in its narrowest, official definition it referred only to those military corps which were wholly or partly-funded out of Army Funds by the War Office.

The British Army during World War I could trace its organisation to the increasing demands of imperial expansion. The framework was the voluntary system of recruitment and the regimental system, which had been defined by the Cardwell and Childers Reforms of the late 19th century (which had followed the 1850s Crimean War and Indian Mutiny that had revealed serious issues with the organisation and administration of the Ordnance Military Corps, civilian stores and transport departments of the Board of Ordnance, the British Army, and the various Reserve Forces). The British Army had been prepared and primarily called upon for Empire matters and the ensuing colonial wars.In the last years of the 19th century, the Army was involved in a major conflict, the Second Boer War (1899–1902), which highlighted shortcomings in its tactics, leadership and administration. The 1904 Esher Report recommended radical reform, such as the creation of an Army Council, a General Staff, the abolition of the office of Commander-in-Chief of the Forces, and the creation of a Chief of the General Staff.

The Haldane Reforms of 1907 formally created an Expeditionary Force of seven divisions (one cavalry, six infantry), reorganised the yeomanry and volunteers forces into a new Territorial Force of fourteen cavalry brigades and fourteen infantry divisions, and changed the old militia into the Special Reserve to reinforce the expeditionary force. At the outbreak of the war in August 1914, the British regular army was a small professional force. It consisted of 247,432 regular troops organised in four regiments of Foot Guards (Grenadier, with 3 Battalions; Coldstream, with 3 Battalions; Scots, with 2 Battalions; Irish with 1 Battalion), 68 regiments of the line and the Rifle Brigade (despite its name, this was an infantry regiment), 31 cavalry regiments (including the Household Cavalry, or Horse Guards), artillery and other support arms.

Most of the line infantry regiments had two regular battalions, one of which served at home and provided drafts and replacements to the other which was stationed overseas, while also being prepared to be part of the Expeditionary Force. The Royal Fusiliers, Worcestershire Regiment, Middlesex Regiment, King's Royal Rifle Corps and the Rifle Brigade (Prince Consort's Own) had four regular battalions, two of which served overseas. Almost half of the regular army (74 of the 157 infantry battalions and 12 of the 31 cavalry regiments), was stationed overseas in garrisons throughout the British Empire. The Royal Flying Corps was part of the British Army until 1918. At the outbreak of the war, it consisted of 84 aircraft.

The regular army was supported by the Territorial Force, which numbered some 246,000 men in September 1913 and, on the outbreak of war, was deployed in home defence. In August 1914, there were three forms of reserves. The Army Reserve comprised soldiers who had completed their colour service, and had joined the reserve upon returning to civilian life; it was 145,347 strong. They were paid 3 shillings and 6 pence a week (17.5 pence) worth about £70 per week in 2013 terms and had to attend 12 training days per year. The Special Reserve had another 64,000 men and was a form of part-time soldiering, similar to the Territorial Force.

A Special Reservist had an initial six months full-time training and was paid the same as a regular soldier during this period; they had three or four weeks training per year thereafter. The National Reserve had some 215,000 men, who were on a register that was maintained by Territorial Force County Associations. These men had military experience, but no other reserve obligation and only some 60,000 were classified as willing or able to serve an active role at home or abroad.

The regulars and reserves, at least on paper, totalled a mobilised force of almost 700,000 men, although only 150,000 men were immediately available to be formed into the British Expeditionary Force (BEF) that was sent to the continent. This consisted of six infantry divisions and one of cavalry. By contrast, the French Army in 1914 mobilised 1,650,000 troops and 62 infantry divisions, while the German Army mobilised 1,850,000 troops and 87 infantry divisions.

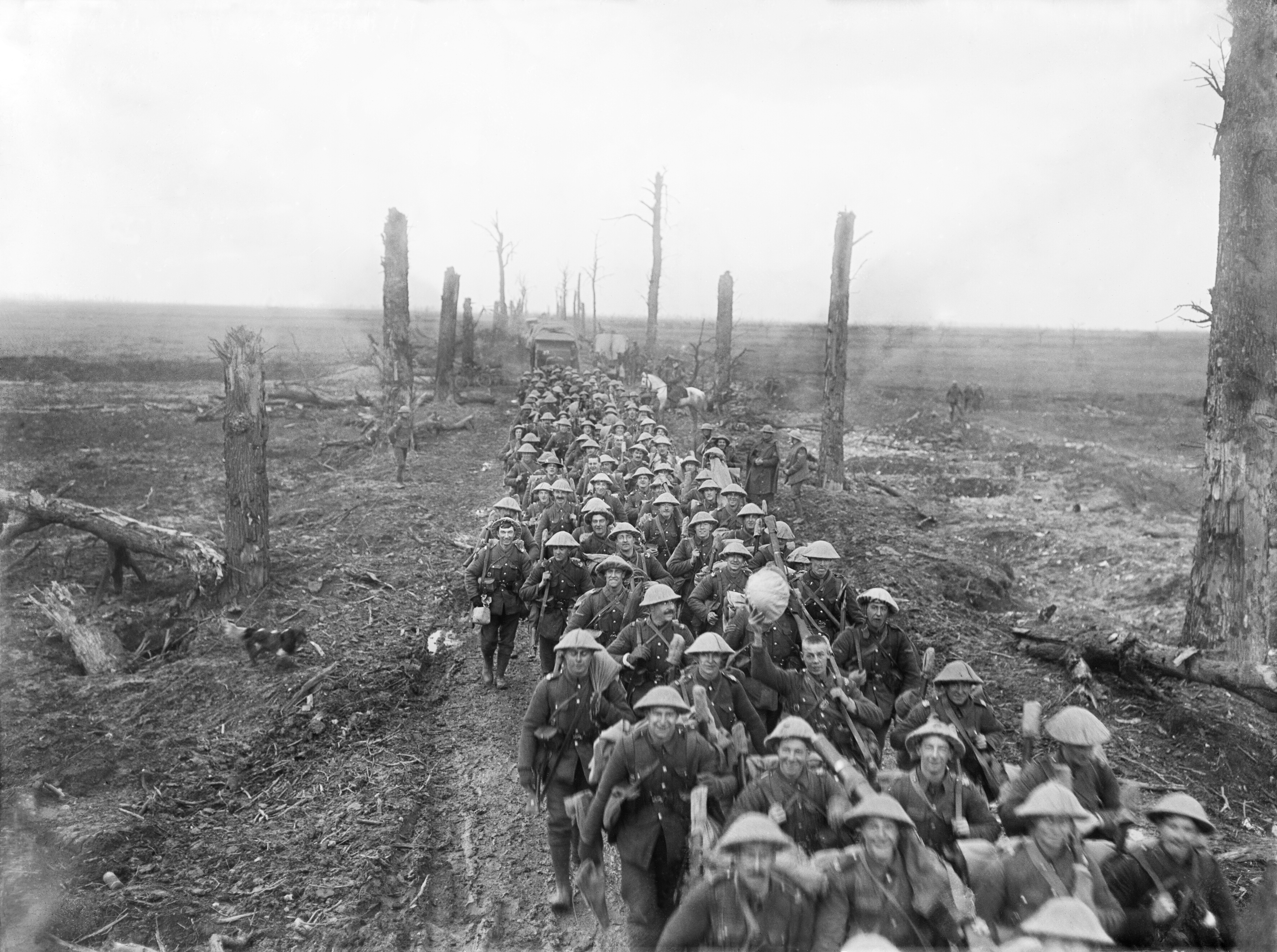
Men of the Sherwood Foresters following up the Germans near Brie, March 1917

Britain, therefore, began the war with six regular and fourteen territorial infantry divisions. During the war, a further six regular, 14 territorial, 36 Kitchener's Army and six other divisions, including the Naval Division from the Royal Navy were formed.

There were also various units organised in the colonies (British territories administered by the Colonial Office) and the Crown dependencies, most on the old Militia or Volunteer Force lines, though few were funded by the War Office (those in the Channel Islands and the Imperial fortress colonies of Bermuda and Malta were funded as part of the British Army). Like the Territorial Force units at the start of the war, these were for local defence, although some drafted volunteers to the Western Front.

=== Divisions ===
In 1914, each British infantry division consisted of three infantry brigades, each of four battalions, with two machine guns per battalion (24 in the division). They also had three field artillery brigades with fifty-four 18-pounder guns, one field howitzer brigade with eighteen 4.5 in (110 mm) howitzers, one heavy artillery battery with four 60-pounder guns, two engineer field companies, one royal engineer signals company, one cavalry squadron, one cyclist company, three field ambulances, four Army Service Corps horse-drawn transport companies, and divisional headquarters support detachments

A British infantry battalion had 4 companies and a machine-gun section with two guns. In August 1914 it included 30 officers and 977 other ranks. It had 25 carts and wagons, including 4 field kitchens. The single cavalry division assigned to the BEF in 1914 consisted of 15 cavalry regiments in five brigades. They were armed with rifles, unlike their French and German counterparts, who were only armed with the shorter range carbine.

The cavalry division also had a high allocation of artillery compared to foreign cavalry divisions, with 24 13-pounder guns organised into two brigades and two machine guns for each regiment. When dismounted, the cavalry division was the equivalent of two weakened infantry brigades with less artillery than the infantry division. By 1916, there were five cavalry divisions, each of three brigades, serving in France, the 1st, 2nd, 3rd divisions in the Cavalry Corps and the 1st and 2nd Indian Cavalry Divisions in the Indian Cavalry Corps, each brigade in the Indian cavalry corps contained a British cavalry regiment.

Over the course of the war, the composition of the infantry division gradually changed, and there was an increased emphasis on providing the infantry divisions with organic fire support. By 1918, a British division consisted of three infantry brigades, each of three battalions. Each of these battalions had 36 Lewis machine guns, making a total of 324 such weapons in the division. Additionally, there was a divisional machine gun battalion, equipped with 64 Vickers machine guns in four companies of 16 guns. Each brigade in the division also had a mortar battery with eight Stokes Mortars.

The artillery also changed the composition of its batteries. At the start of the war, there were three batteries with six guns per brigade. This changed to four batteries with four guns per brigade and finally, in 1917, to four batteries with six guns per brigade to economise on battery commanders. In this way, the army would change drastically over the course of the war, reacting to the various developments, from the mobile war fought in the opening weeks to the static trench warfare of 1916 and 1917. The cavalry of the BEF represented 9.28% of the army, but by July 1918 it would only represent 1.65%. The infantry would decrease from 64.64% in 1914 to 51.25% of the army in 1918, while the Royal Engineers would increase from 5.91% to 11.24% in 1918.

== British Expeditionary Force ==
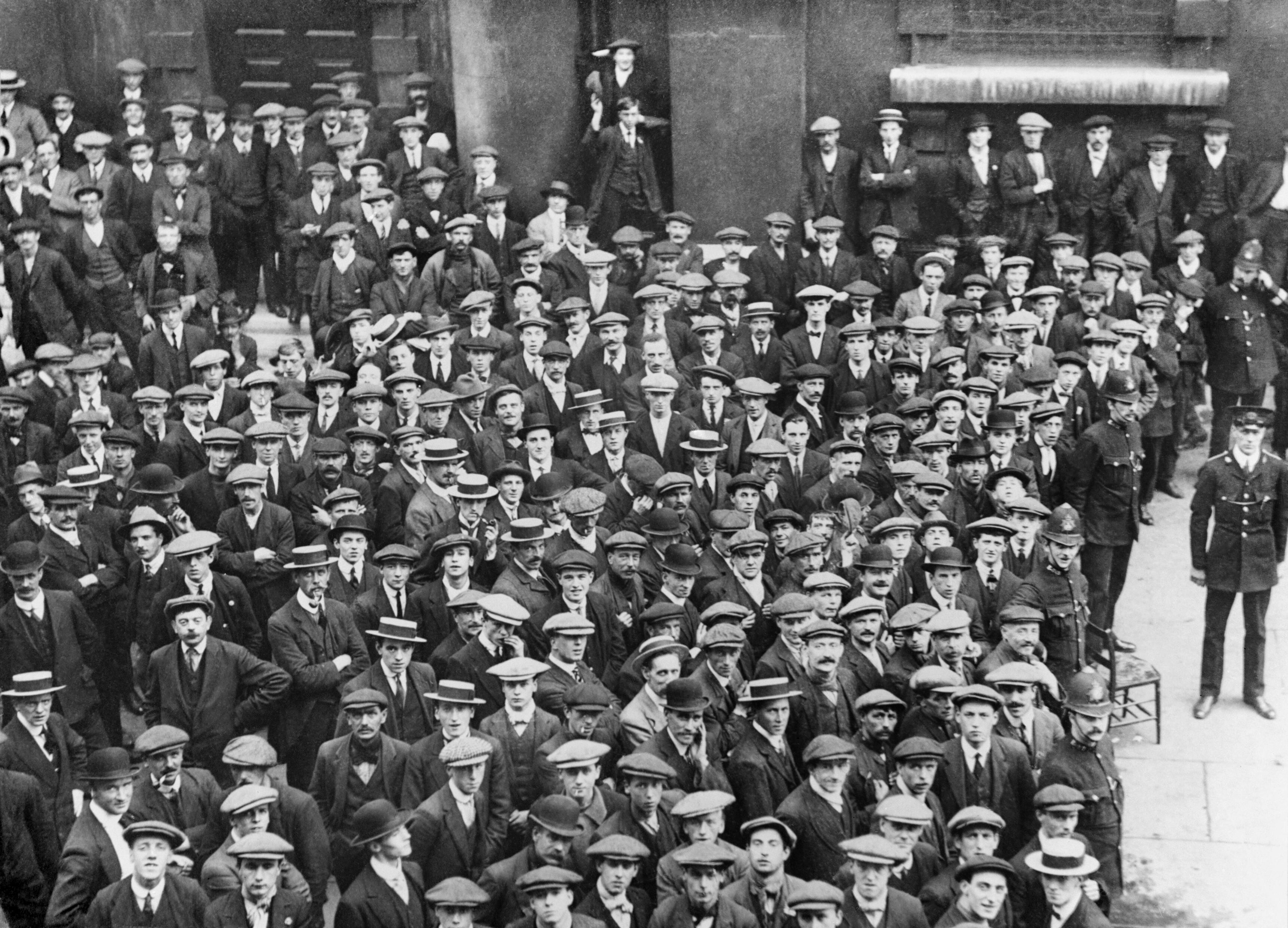
August 1914: London volunteers await their pay at St. Martin-in-the-Fields

Under the terms of the Entente Cordiale, the British Army's role in a European war was to embark soldiers of the British Expeditionary Force (BEF) which consisted of six infantry divisions and five cavalry brigades arranged into two Army corps: I Corps under the command of Douglas Haig, and II Corps under the command of Horace Smith-Dorrien. At the outset of the conflict, the British Indian Army was called upon for assistance—in August 1914, 20 percent of the 9,610 British officers and 16 percent of the 76,450 other ranks initially sent to France were from the Indian army. By the end of 1914 (after the battles of Mons, Le Cateau, the Aisne and Ypres), the old regular British Army had been virtually wiped out, although managing to stop the German advance in the process.

In October 1914, the 7th Division arrived in France, forming the basis of the British III Corps. Meanwhile, the cavalry had grown into its own corps of three divisions. By December 1914, the BEF had expanded, fielding five army corps divided between the First and the Second Armies. As the Regular Army's strength declined, the numbers were made up, first by the Territorial Force and then by the volunteers of Field Marshal Kitchener's New Army. By the end of August 1914, he had raised six new divisions and by March 1915, the number of divisions had increased to 29. The Territorial Force was also expanded, raising second and third battalions and forming eight new divisions, which supplemented its peacetime strength of 14 divisions. The Third Army was formed in July 1915 and with the influx of troops from Kitchener's volunteers and further reorganisation, the Fourth Army and the Reserve Army, which became the Fifth Army were formed in 1916.

== Recruitment and conscription ==
In August 1914, 300,000 men had signed up to fight with another 450,000 having joined up by the end of September. A prominent feature of the early months of volunteering was the formation of Pals battalions. These were men who had lived and worked together, and who as an incentive to recruitment were allowed to train together and serve in the same units. The policy ensured that, when the Pals battalions suffered casualties, whole communities back in Britain were to suffer disproportionate losses. With the introduction of conscription in January 1916, no further Pals battalions were raised.

Conscription for single men was introduced in January 1916. The Military Service Act 1916 specified that men from the ages of 18 to 41 were liable to be called up for service in the army, unless they were married (or widowed with children), or served in one of a number of reserved occupations, which were usually industrial but which also included clergymen and teachers. This legislation did not apply to Ireland, despite its then status as part of the United Kingdom (but see Conscription Crisis of 1918). Conscription was extended to married men in May 1916. By January 1916, when conscription was introduced, 2.6 million men had volunteered for service, a further 2.3 million were conscripted before the end of the war; by the end of 1918, the army had reached its peak strength of four million men.

Analysis of death records from the Hundred Days (August–November 1918) suggests that around 60% of those who died were conscripts (many of the men "combed out" from rear echelon jobs and posted to the front lines in 1917-18 had volunteered earlier in the war) and that despite the recent lowering of the age limit for service on the Western Front from nineteen to eighteen-and-a-half, the average age of the dead was still in the mid-twenties. Alison Hine comments that although incompleteness of records makes it hard to say whether these dead men were a representative sample of the BEF as a whole, assertions that the late-war BEF consisted largely of conscripted "boys" should therefore be treated with caution. Furthermore, although there were certainly many cases of men being sent to regiments from parts of the country other than their own, many battalions were still filled with men from their traditional local areas, the same as earlier in the war. Caution therefore should be employed before accepting claims that there was a deliberate attempt to "destroy the Regiment … and nationalise the Army"

Women also volunteered and served in a non-combatant role—by the end of the war, 80,000 had enlisted. They mostly served as nurses in the Queen Alexandra's Imperial Military Nursing Service (QAIMNS), the First Aid Nursing Yeomanry (FANY), the Voluntary Aid Detachment (VAD) and, from 1917, in the Army when the Women's Army Auxiliary Corps (WAAC), was founded. The WAAC was divided into four sections: cookery; mechanical; clerical and miscellaneous. Most stayed on the Home Front, but around 9,000 served in France.

== Commanders ==
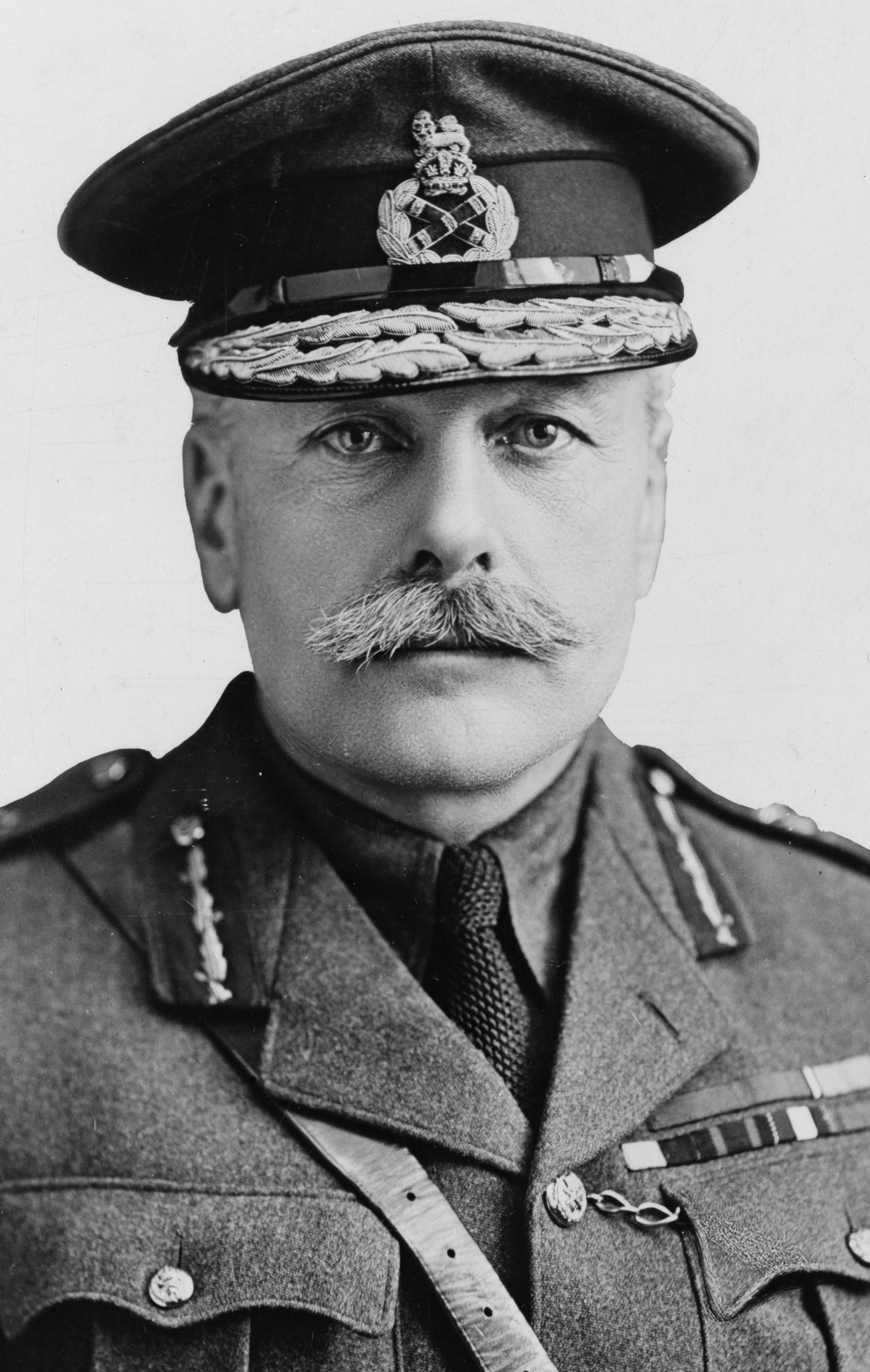
Field Marshal Douglas Haig, 1st Earl Haig.

In 1914, no serving British officer of the British Expeditionary Force (BEF) had controlled a formation larger than a division on active operations. The first Commander in Chief of the BEF appointed in August 1914 was Field Marshal John French whose last active command had been the cavalry division in the Second Boer War. The commander of the British I Corps in 1914 was Douglas Haig. French had remarked in 1912 that Haig would be better suited to a position on the staff than a field command. Like French, Haig was a cavalryman. His last active command had been during the Second Boer War, first as a senior staff officer in the cavalry division, then commanding a brigade-sized group of columns.

The first commander of the British II Corps was Lieutenant General James Grierson, a noted tactician who died of a heart attack soon after arriving in France. French wished to appoint Lieutenant General Herbert Plumer in his place, but against French's wishes, Kitchener instead appointed Lieutenant General Horace Smith-Dorrien, who had begun his military career in the Zulu War in 1879 and was one of only five officers to survive the battle of Isandlwana. He had built a formidable reputation as an infantry commander during the Sudan Campaign and the Second Boer War. After the Second Boer War, he was responsible for a number of reforms, notably forcing an increase in dismounted training for the cavalry. This was met with hostility by French (as a cavalryman) and by 1914, French's dislike for Smith-Dorrien was well known within the army.

After the failed offensive at the Battle of Loos in 1915, French was replaced as commander of the BEF by Haig, who remained in command for the rest of the war. He became most famous for his role as its commander during the battle of the Somme, the battle of Passchendaele, and the Hundred Days Offensive, the series of victories leading to the German surrender in 1918. Haig was succeeded in command of the First Army by General Charles Carmichael Monro, who in turn was succeeded by General Sir Henry Horne in September 1916, the only officer with an artillery background to command a British army during the war.

General Plumer was eventually appointed to command V Corps in December 1914, and succeeded Smith-Dorrien in command of the Second Army in 1915. He had commanded a mounted infantry detachment in the Second Boer war, where he started to build his reputation. He held command of the Ypres salient for three years and gained an overwhelming victory over the German Army at the battle of Messines in 1917. Plumer is generally recognised as one of the most effective of the senior British commanders on the Western Front.

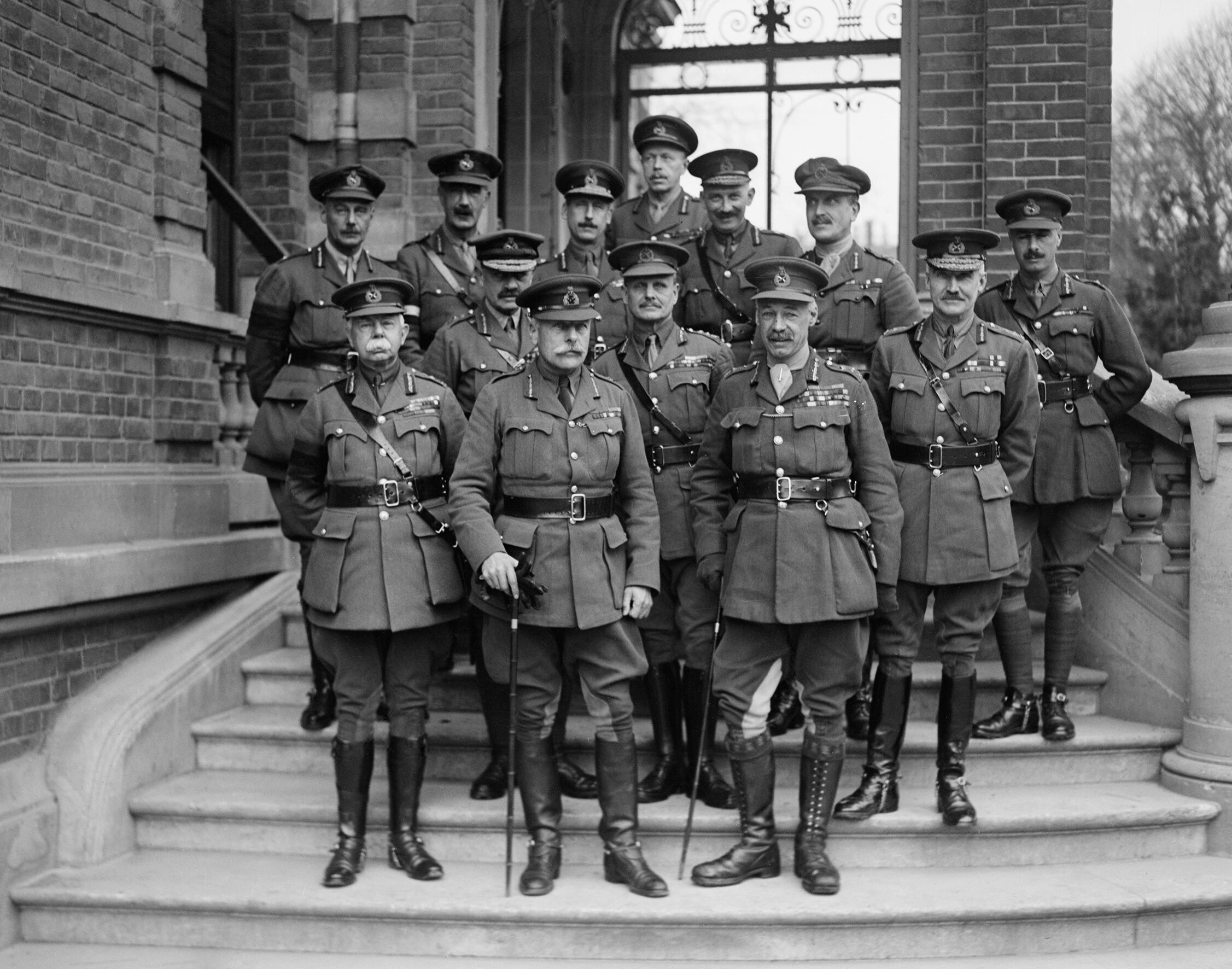
Sir Douglas Haig with his army commanders and their chiefs of staff, November 1918. Front row, left to right: Sir Herbert Plumer, Sir Douglas Haig, Sir Henry Rawlinson. Middle row, left to right: Sir Julian Byng, Sir William Birdwood, Sir Henry Horne. Back row, left to right: Sir Herbert Lawrence, Sir Charles Kavanagh, Brudenell White, Percy, Louis Vaughan, Archibald Montgomery-Massingberd, Hastings Anderson.

In 1914, General Edmund Allenby was commander of the Cavalry Division and later the Cavalry Corps in the BEF. His leadership was noted during the retreat from Mons and the first battle of Ypres. After commanding an infantry corps, he was appointed to command the Third Army on the western front. He had previously served in the Zulu War, the Sudan campaign, and the Second Boer war. In 1917, he was given command of the Egyptian Expeditionary Force, where he oversaw the conquest of Palestine and Syria in 1917 and 1918. Allenby replaced Archibald Murray, who had been the Chief of Staff of the British Expeditionary Force in France in 1914. Allenby was replaced as Third Army commander by General Julian Byng, who began the war as commander of the 3rd Cavalry Division. After performing well during the First Battle of Ypres, he succeeded Allenby in command of the Cavalry Corps. He was sent to the Dardanelles in August 1915, to command the British IX Corps. He planned the highly successful evacuation of 105,000 Allied troops and the majority of the equipment of the Mediterranean Expeditionary Force (MEF). The withdrawal was successfully completed in January 1916 without the loss of a single man.

Byng had already returned to the western front, where he was given command of the Canadian Corps. His most notable battle was the Battle of Vimy Ridge in April 1917, which was carried out by the Canadian Corps with British support. General Henry Rawlinson served on Kitchener's staff during the advance on Omdurman, in 1898, and served with distinction in the Second Boer War, where he earned a reputation as one of the most able British commanders. Rawlinson took command of the British IV Corps in 1914 and then command of the Fourth Army in 1916, as the plans for the Allied offensive on the Somme were being developed. During the war, Rawlinson was noted for his willingness to use innovative tactics, which he employed during the battle of Amiens, where he combined attacks by tanks with artillery.

General Hubert Gough commanded a mounted infantry regiment with distinction during the relief of Ladysmith, but his command was destroyed while attacking a larger Boer force in 1901. When he joined the BEF, he was in command of the 3rd Cavalry Brigade, and was promoted from a brigade to a corps command in less than a year. He was given command of the 2nd Cavalry Division in September 1914, the 7th Division in April 1915, and the British I Corps in July 1915. He commanded I Corps during the battle of Loos and, in May 1916, was appointed commander of the Fifth Army, which suffered heavy losses at the battle of Passchendaele. The collapse of the Fifth Army was widely viewed as the reason for the German breakthrough in the Spring Offensive, and Gough was dismissed as its commander in March 1918, being succeeded by General William Birdwood for the last months of the war. Birdwood had previously commanded the Australian Corps, an appointment requiring a combination of tact and tactical flair. On the Macedonian front, General George Milne commanded the British Salonika Army, and General Ian Hamilton commanded the ill-fated MEF during the Gallipoli Campaign. He had previously seen service in the First Boer War, the Sudan campaign, and the Second Boer War.

Back in Britain, Chief of the Imperial General Staff (CIGS), effectively the professional head of the British Army, was General James Murray who retained that post during the early years of the war. He was replaced as CIGS for a brief period in late 1915 by Archibald Murray and later, at the end of 1915 by General William Robertson. A strong supporter of Haig, Robertson was replaced in 1918 by General Henry Hughes Wilson.

=== Officer selection ===
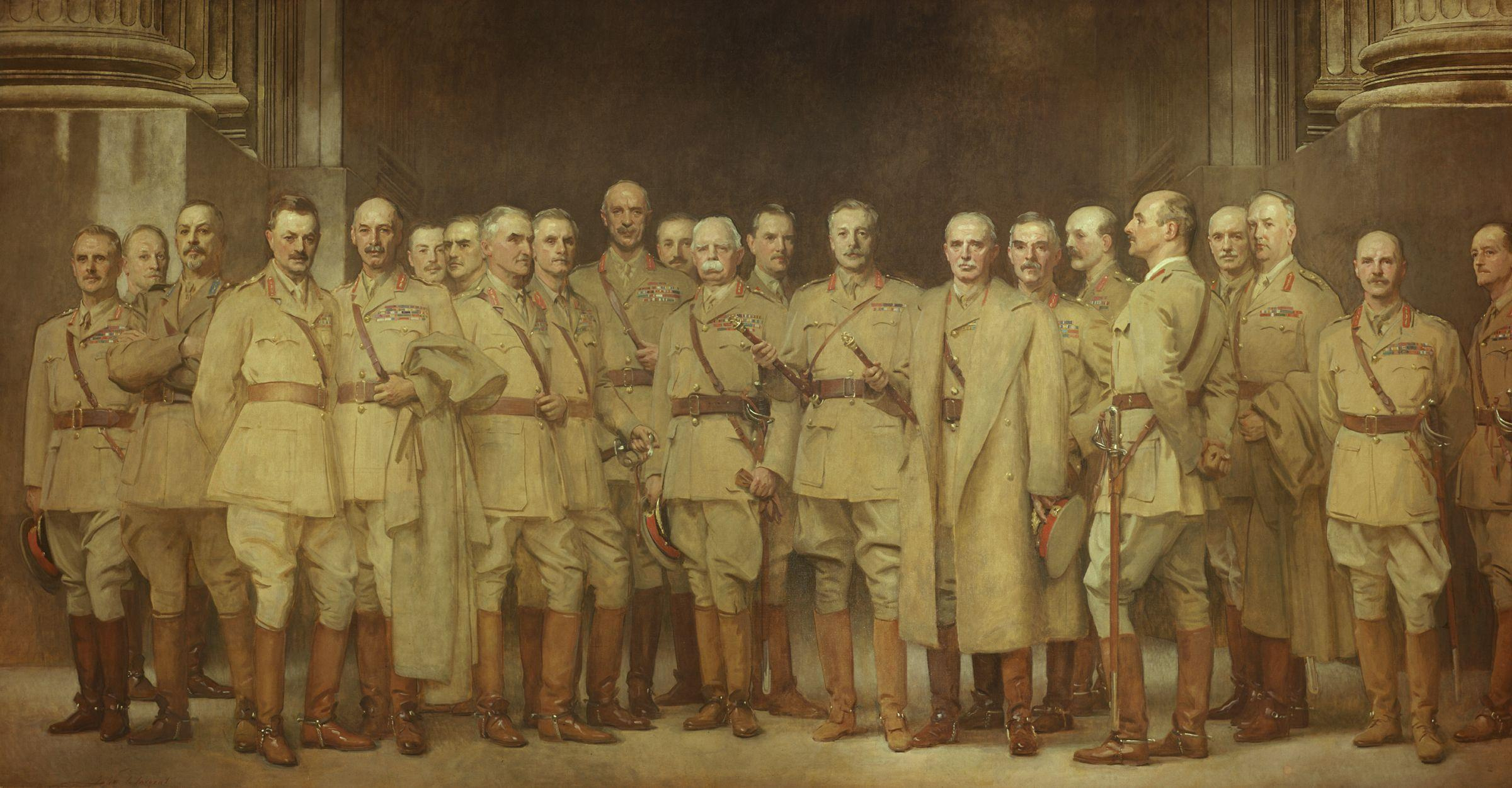
General Officers of World War I, painting by John Singer Sargent (1922).

In August 1914, there were 28,060 officers in the British Army, of which 12,738 were regular officers, the rest were in the reserves. The number of officers in the army had increased to 164,255 by November 1918. These were survivors among the 247,061 officers who had been granted a commission during the war. Most pre-war officers came from families with military connections, the gentry or the peerage and a public school education was almost essential. In 1913, about 2% of regular officers had been promoted from the ranks. The officer corps, during the war, consisted of regular officers from the peacetime army, officers who had been granted permanent commissions during the war, officers who had been granted temporary commissions for the duration of the war, territorial army officers commissioned during peacetime, officers commissioned from the ranks of the pre-war regular, and territorial army and temporary officers commissioned from the ranks for the duration of the war alone.

In September 1914, Lord Kitchener announced that he was looking for volunteers and regular NCOs to provide officers for the expanding army. Most of the volunteers came from the middle class, with the largest group from commercial and clerical occupations (27%), followed by teachers and students (18%) and professional men (15%). In March 1915, it was discovered that 12,290 men serving in the ranks had been members of a university or public school Officers' Training Corps (OTC). Most applied for and were granted commissions, while others who did not apply were also commissioned. Direct commissioning largely ceased early in 1916 and from then on most new officers had served in the ranks first, even if in a unit of potential officers.

Once a candidate was selected as an officer, promotion could be rapid. A. S. Smeltzer was commissioned as a second lieutenant in 1915, after serving in the Regular Army for 15 years. He rose in rank, and by the spring of 1917 had been promoted to lieutenant colonel and was commanding officer of the 6th Battalion, The Buffs (Royal East Kent Regiment). Along with rapid promotion, the war also noticeably lowered the age of battalion commanding officers. In 1914, they were aged over 50, while the average age for a battalion commanding officer in the BEF between 1917 and 1918 was 28. By this stage, it was official policy that men over 35 were no longer eligible to command battalions. This trend was reflected amongst the junior officers. Anthony Eden was the Adjutant of a battalion when aged 18, and served as the brigade major in the 198th Brigade while still only aged 20.

The war also provided opportunities for advancement onto the General Staff, especially in the early days when many former senior officers were recalled from retirement. Some of these were found wanting, due to their advanced age, their unwillingness to serve, or a lack of competence and fitness. Most were sent back into retirement before the first year of the war was over, leaving a gap that had to be filled by lower-ranking officers. Criticism of the quality of staff work in the Crimean War and the Second Boer War had led to sweeping changes under Haldane. The Staff College, Camberley was greatly expanded and Lord Kitchener established another one, the Staff College at Quetta for Indian Army officers in 1904. Nonetheless, when war broke out in August 1914, there were barely enough graduates to staff the BEF.

Four-month-long staff courses were introduced and filled with regimental officers who, upon completing their training, were posted to various headquarters. As a result, staff work was again poor, until training and experience slowly remedied the situation. In 1918, staff officers who had been trained exclusively for static trench warfare were forced to adapt to the demands of semi-open warfare. During the course of the war, 78 British and Dominion officers of the rank of brigadier-general and above were killed or died during active service, while another 146 were wounded, gassed, or captured.

== Doctrine ==
British official historian Brigadier James Edward Edmonds, in 1925, recorded that "The British Army of 1914 was the best trained, best equipped and best organized British Army ever sent to war". This was in part due to the Haldane reforms, and the Army itself recognising the need for change and training. Training began with individual training in winter, followed by squadron, company or battery training in spring. Regimental, battalion and brigade training took place in summer and division or inter-divisional exercises and army manoeuvres in late summer and autumn. The common doctrine of headquarters at all levels was outlined in the Field Service Pocket Book which Haig had introduced while serving as Director of Staff Studies at the War Office in 1906.

The Second Boer War had alerted the army to the dangers posed by fire zones that were covered by long-range magazine-fed rifles. In the place of volley firing and frontal attacks, there was a greater emphasis on advancing in extended order, the use of available cover, the use of artillery to support the attack, flank and converging attacks and fire and movement. The Army expected units to advance as far as possible in a firing line without opening fire, both to conceal their positions and conserve ammunition, then to attack in successive waves, closing with the enemy decisively.

The cavalry practised reconnaissance and fighting dismounted more regularly, and in January 1910, the decision was made at the General Staff Conference that dismounted cavalry should be taught infantry tactics in attack and defence. They were the only cavalry from a major European power trained for both the mounted cavalry charge and dismounted action, and equipped with the same rifles as the infantry, rather than short-range carbines. The cavalry were also issued with entrenching tools prior to the outbreak of war as a result of experience gained during the Second Boer War.

The infantry's marksmanship and fire and movement techniques had been inspired by Boer tactics and were established as formal doctrine by Colonel Charles Monro when he was in charge of the School of Musketry at Hythe. In 1914, British rifle fire was so effective that there were some reports to the effect that the Germans believed they were facing huge numbers of machine guns. The Army concentrated on rifle practice, with days spent on the ranges dedicated to improving marksmanship and obtaining a rate of fire of 15 effective rounds a minute at 300 yd (270 m). One sergeant set a record of 38 rounds into a 12 in (300 mm) target set at 300 yd (270 m) in 30 seconds.

In their 1914 skill-at-arms meeting, the 1st Battalion Black Watch recorded 184 marksmen, 263 first-class shots, 89-second-class shots and four third-class shots, at ranges from 300–600 yd (270–550 m). The infantry also practised squad and section attacks and fire from cover, often without orders from officers or NCOs so that soldiers would be able to act on their own initiative. In the last exercise before the war, it was noted that the "infantry made wonderful use of ground, advances in short rushes and always at the double and almost invariably fires from a prone position".

=== Weapons ===
The British Army was armed with the Short Magazine Lee–Enfield Mk III (SMLE Mk III) which featured a bolt-action and large magazine capacity that enabled a trained rifleman to fire 20–30 aimed rounds a minute. First World War accounts tell of British troops repelling German attackers, who subsequently reported that they had encountered machine guns, when in fact, it was simply a group of trained riflemen armed with SMLEs.

The heavy Vickers machine gun proved itself to be the most reliable weapon on the battlefield, with some of its feats of endurance entering military mythology. One account tells of the action by the 100th Company of the Machine Gun Corps at High Wood on 24 August 1916. This company had 10 Vickers guns and was ordered to give sustained covering fire for 12 hours onto a selected area 2,000 yd (1,800 m) away in order to prevent German troops forming up there for a counterattack while a British attack was in progress. Two companies of infantry were allocated as ammunition, rations and water carriers for the gunners. Two men worked a belt–filling machine non–stop for 12 hours, keeping up a supply of 250-round belts. They used 100 new barrels and all of the water, including the men's drinking water and the contents of the latrine buckets, to keep the guns cool. In that 12-hour period, the 10 guns fired just short of one million rounds between them. One team is reported to have fired 120,000. At the close of the operation, it is alleged that every gun was working perfectly and that not one had broken down during the whole period.

The lighter Lewis gun was adopted for land and aircraft use in October 1915. This had the advantage of being about 80% faster to build than the Vickers and far more portable. By the end of the First World War, over 50,000 Lewis Guns had been produced. They were nearly ubiquitous on the Western Front, outnumbering the Vickers gun by a ratio of about 3:1.

The British used improvised mortars as a stop-gap, with the 2-inch medium mortar and its "toffee apple" projectile being deployed from March 1915. This was superseded by the 81mm Stokes Mortar, first issued at the end of 1915 which was later adopted by the French Army too.

Finally, the Mark I tank, a British invention, was seen as the solution to the stalemate of trench warfare. The Mark I had a range of 23 mi (37 km) without refuelling, a speed of 3 mph (4.8 km/h), and first saw service on the Somme in September 1916.

=== Infantry tactics ===
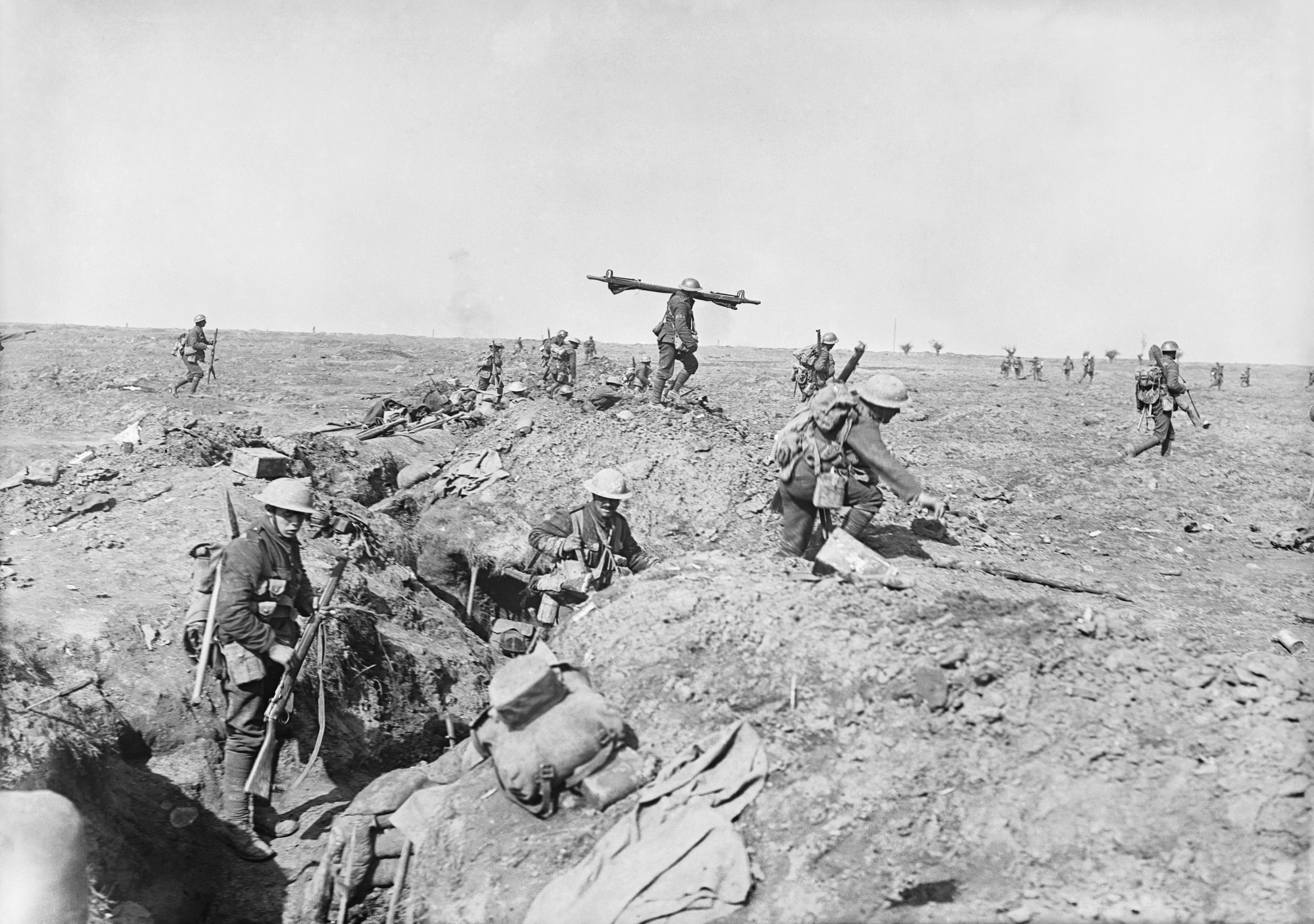
British infantry advancing in support during the battle of Morval, 25 September 1916, part of the battle of the Somme

After the "race to the sea", manoeuvre warfare gave way to trench warfare, a development for which the British Army had not prepared. Expecting an offensive mobile war, the Army had not instructed the troops in defensive tactics and had failed to obtain stocks of barbed wire, hand grenades, or trench mortars. In the early years of trench warfare, the normal infantry attack formation was based on the battalion and comprised four companies that were each made up of four platoons. The battalion would form 10 waves with 100 yd (91 m) between each, while each company formed two waves of two platoons. The first six waves were the fighting elements from three of the battalions' companies, the seventh contained the battalion headquarters. The remaining company formed the eighth and ninth waves which were expected to carry equipment forward and the tenth wave contained the stretcher bearers and medics.

The formation was expected to move forward at a rate of 100 yd (91 m) every two minutes, even though each man carried his rifle, bayonet, gas mask, ammunition, two hand grenades, wire cutters, a spade, two empty sandbags and flares. The carrying platoons, in addition to the above, also carried extra ammunition, barbed wire and construction materials to effect repairs to captured lines and fortifications. By 1918, experience had led to a change in tactics—the infantry no longer advanced in rigid lines, but formed a series of flexible waves. They would move covertly, under the cover of darkness, and occupy shell holes or other cover near the German line. Skirmishers formed the first wave and followed the creeping barrage into the German front line to hunt out points of resistance. The second or main wave followed in platoons or sections in single file. The third was formed from small groups of reinforcements, the fourth wave was expected to defend the captured territory. All waves were expected to take advantage of the ground during the advance. (See below for the procedure when operating with tanks.)

Each platoon now had a Lewis gun section and a section that specialised in throwing hand-grenades (then known as bombs) and each section was compelled to provide two scouts to carry out reconnaissance duties. Each platoon was expected to provide mutual fire support in the attack they were to advance, without halting. However, leap frogging was accepted, with the lead platoon taking an objective and the following platoons passing through them and onto the next objective, while the Lewis gunners provided fire support. Grenades were used for clearing trenches and dugouts and each battalion carried forward two trench mortars to provide fire support.

=== Tank tactics ===
The tank was designed to break the deadlock of trench warfare. In their first use on the Somme, they were placed under command of the infantry and ordered to attack their given targets in groups or pairs. They were also assigned small groups of troops, who served as an escort while providing close defence against enemy attacks. Only nine tanks reached the German lines to engage machine gun emplacements and troop concentrations. On the way, 14 broke down or were ditched, another 10 were damaged by enemy fire.

In 1917, during the battle of Cambrai, the Tank Corps adopted new tactics. Three tanks working together would advance in a triangle formation, with the two rear tanks providing cover for an infantry platoon. The tanks were to create gaps in the barbed wire for the accompanying infantry to pass through and then to use their armament to suppress the German strong points. The effectiveness of tank–infantry co-operation was demonstrated during the battle when Major General George Harper of the 51st (Highland) Division refused to co-operate with the tanks, a decision that compelled them to move forward without any infantry support. The result was the destruction of more than 12 tanks by German artillery sighted behind bunkers.

The situation had changed again by 1918, when tank attacks would have one tank every 100 or 200 yd (180 m), with a tank company of 12–16 tanks per objective. One section of each company would be out in front, with the remainder of the company following behind and each tank providing protection for an infantry platoon, who were instructed to advance, making use of available cover and supported by machine-gun fire. When the tanks came across an enemy strong point, they would engage the defenders, forcing them into shelter and leaving them to be dealt with by the following infantry.

=== Artillery tactics ===
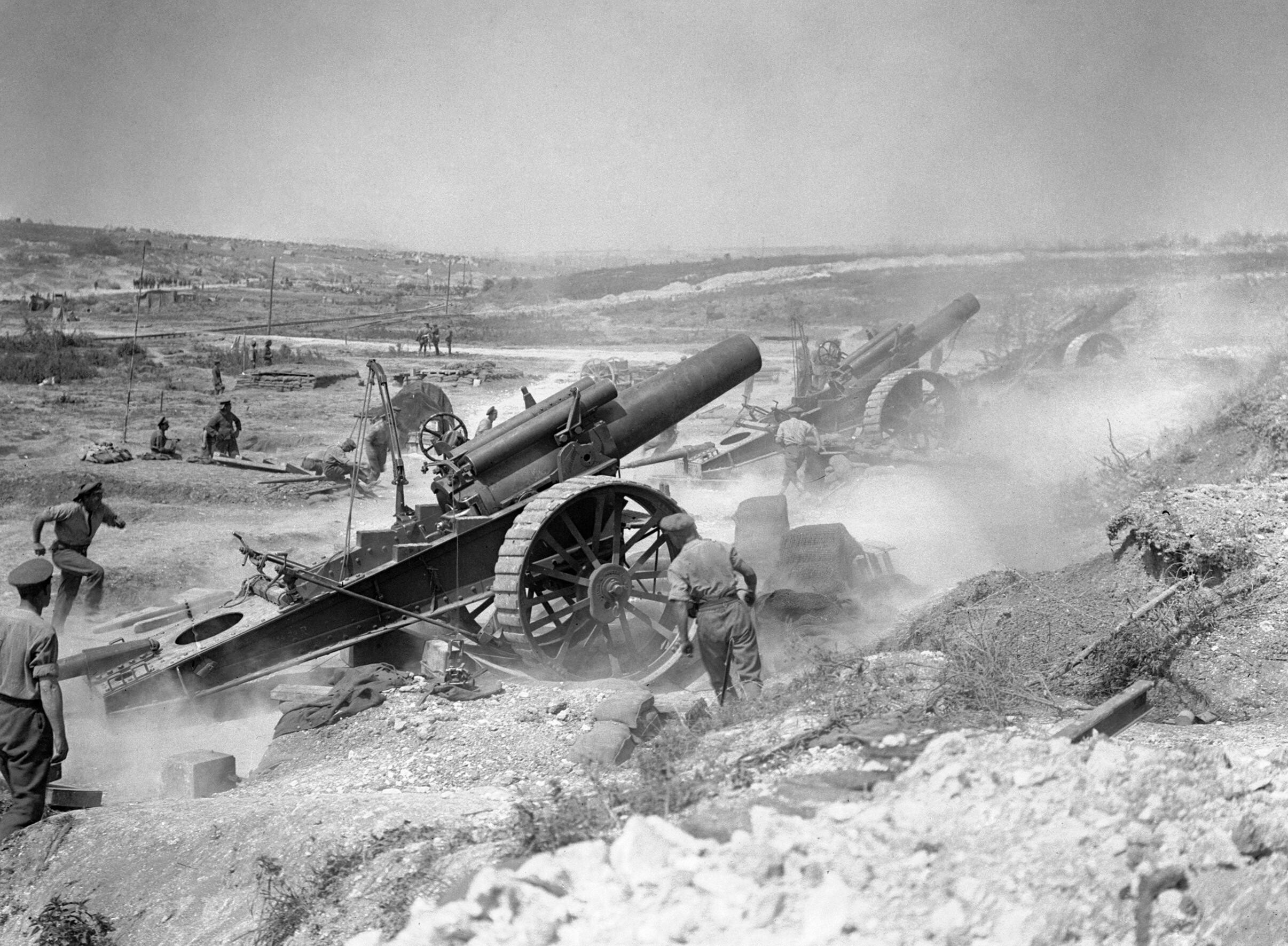
8 in (203 mm) howitzers of the 39th Siege Battery, Royal Garrison Artillery conducting a shoot in the Fricourt-Mametz valley, August 1916, during the battle of the Somme.

Prior to the war, the artillery worked independently and was taught to support the infantry to ensure a successful attack. In 1914, the heaviest artillery gun was the 60-pounder, with four in each heavy battery. The Royal Horse Artillery employed the 13-pounder, while the Royal Field Artillery used the 18-pounder gun. By 1918, the situation had changed and the artillery were the dominant force on the battlefield. Between 1914 and 1918, the Royal Field Artillery increased from 45 to 173 field brigades, while the heavy and siege artillery of the Royal Garrison Artillery had increased from 32 heavy and six siege batteries to 117 and 401 respectively. With this increase in the number of batteries of heavier guns, the armies needed to find a more efficient method of moving the heavier guns around.

It was proving difficult to find the number of draught horses required. The War Office ordered over 1,000 Holt 75 caterpillar tractors, which transformed the mobility of the siege artillery. The army also mounted a variety of surplus naval guns on various railway platforms to provide mobile long-range heavy artillery on the Western Front.

Until 1914, artillery generally fired over open sights at visible targets, the largest unit accustomed to firing at a single target was the artillery regiment or brigade. One innovation brought about by the adoption of trench warfare was the barrage, a term first used in the battle of Neuve Chapelle in 1915. Trench warfare had created the need for indirect fire, with the use of observers, more sophisticated artillery fire plans, and an increasingly scientific approach to gunnery where artillerymen had to use increasingly complicated calculations to lay the guns. Individual guns were aimed so that their fall of shot was coordinated with others to form a pattern—in the case of a barrage the pattern was a line.

The creeping barrage was a barrage that lifted in small increments, perhaps 50 yd (46 m), so that it moved forward slowly, keeping pace with the infantry, who were trained to follow close behind the moving wall of their own fire, often as close as 55 yd (50 m). Infantry commanders were encouraged to keep their troops as close to the barrage as possible, even at the risk of casualties from friendly fire. A creeping barrage could maintain the element of surprise, with guns opening fire only shortly before the assault troops moved off. It was useful when enemy positions had not been thoroughly reconnoitred as it did not depend on identifying individual targets in advance.

The idea behind the creeping barrage was that the infantry should reach the enemy positions before the defenders had time to recover, emerge from shelters, and man their positions. On the first day of the battle of the Somme, the barrage outpaced the infantry, allowing the defenders to recover and emerge from their dugouts, with disastrous results for the attackers. The creeping barrage demonstrated its effectiveness a year later, in 1917, during the Second Battle of Arras. A weakness of the creeping barrage was that the infantry was subordinated to the artillery schedule, while the infantry commanders had less control over the tactical situation and were therefore in danger of forgetting how to manoeuvre their troops around the battlefield. The importance of the barrage was such that traditional infantry tactics, including a reliance on the infantry's own firepower to support its movement forward, was sometimes forgotten.

Once the infantry had reached the German trenches, the artillery shifted from the creeping barrage to the standing barrage, a static barrage ahead of the infantry that would protect them from counter-attack while they consolidated the position. A variant was the box barrage, in which three or four barrages formed a box (or more often three sides of a box) around a position to isolate and prevent reinforcements being brought up into the front line. This was normally used to protect trench raids, although it could also be used offensively against a German unit. Another type of barrage was the SOS barrage, fired in response to a German counterattack. An SOS barrage could be brought down by firing a flare signal of a pre-arranged colour as a German barrage tended to cut the telephone lines. A pre-registered barrage would then descend on No Man's Land.

With the introduction of the tank, the artillery was no longer required to aid the infantry by destroying obstacles and machine gun positions. Instead, the artillery assisted by neutralising the German artillery with counter-battery fire. British Army researchers under Lieutenant William Lawrence Bragg developed sound ranging, a method of determining the location of hostile artillery from the sound of its guns firing. A Counter Battery Staff Officer (CBSO) was assigned to each corps to coordinate the counter-battery effort, collating reports from sound ranging and Royal Flying Corps observers. By the end of the war, it was realised that the important effect of the barrage was to demoralise and suppress the enemy, rather than physical destruction. A short, intense bombardment immediately followed by an infantry assault was more effective than the weeks of grinding bombardment used in 1916.

=== Communications ===
The Royal Engineers Signal Service, formed in 1912, was given responsibility for communications that included signal dispatch, telegraph, telephone and later Wireless communications, from army headquarters to brigade and down to battery level for the artillery. For most of the war, the Army's primary methods of communication were signal dispatch (employing runners, messengers on horseback, dogs, and carrier pigeons), visual signalling, telegraph, and telephone. At the start of the war, the Army had a small number of wireless sets, which in addition to being heavy and unreliable, operated on longwave. In 1915, trench wireless sets were introduced, but the transmissions were easily intercepted by the listening Germans.

Civilian telephones were used at the outset of the war, but they were found to be unreliable in the damp, muddy conditions that prevailed. Consequently, the field telephone was designed; a device that operated with its own switchboard. Apart from voice communication, it featured a buzzer unit with a Morse code key, so that it could be used to send and receive coded messages. This facility proved useful when, in the midst of bombardment, exploding shells drowned out voice communication. The telephones were connected by lines that sustained continual damage as a result of shell fire and the movement of troops. The lines were generally buried, with redundant lines set in place to compensate for breakages.

The primary types of visual signalling were Semaphore flags, lamps and flags, lamps and lights, and the heliograph. In open warfare, visual signalling (employing signal flags and the heliograph) was the norm. A competent signaller could transmit 12 words a minute with signal flags (during daylight) and signal lights (at night). Signal lights, which were secured in a wooden case, employed a battery-operated Morse code key. These signalling techniques had certain disadvantages, however. In trench warfare, operators using these methods were forced to expose themselves to enemy fire; while messages sent to the rear by signal lights could not be seen by enemy forces, replies to such messages were readily spotted, and operators were, once again, exposed to enemy fire. During the war, the Army also trained animals for use in the trenches. Dogs carried messages; horses, mules and dogs were used to lay telephone and telegraph cables. Carrier pigeons, who transported messages back from the front line, were also carried in tanks so that they could deliver messages during an attack. Over 20,000 pigeons and 370 handlers were used during the war, and at times, they were the sole means of communication.

=== Royal Flying Corps ===
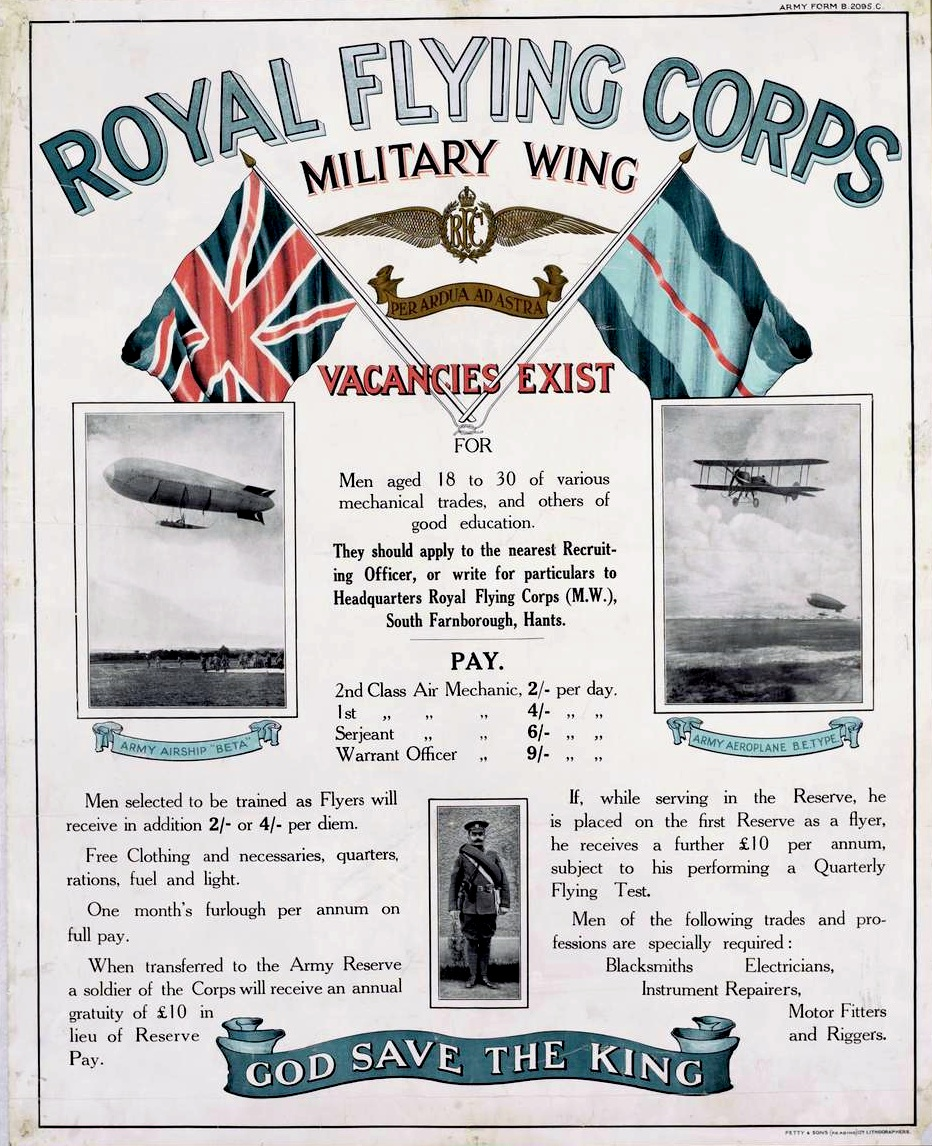
Royal Flying Corps the First World War recruiting poster

At the start of the war, the Royal Flying Corps (RFC) in the Field, commanded by Sir David Henderson consisted of five squadrons—one observation balloon squadron (RFC No 1 Squadron) and four aeroplane squadrons (Nos 2, 3, 4 and 5). These units were first used for aerial spotting on 13 September 1914, but only became efficient when they perfected the use of wireless communication at Aubers Ridge on 9 May 1915. Aerial photography was attempted during 1914, but again, it only became effective the following year. In August 1915, General Hugh Trenchard replaced Henderson. The British use of air power evolved during the war, from a reconnaissance force to a fighting force that attempted to gain command of the air above the trenches and carry out bombing raids on targets behind the line. The early aircraft of the RFC were inferior to their German rivals; in April 1917, (known as Bloody April), the RFC lost over 300 aircrew and 245 aircraft. Not until late 1917, with the introduction of the Sopwith Camel and the S.E.5, were they able to compete successfully for control of the air.

On 17 August 1917, General Jan Smuts presented a report to the War Council concerning the future of air power. Given its potential for the 'devastation of enemy lands and the destruction of industrial targets and centres of population on a vast scale'. He recommended a new air service be formed that would be on a level with the Army and Royal Navy. The formation of the new service, however, would make use of the under-utilised men and machines of the Royal Naval Air Service (RNAS), as well as ending the inter-service rivalries that at times had adversely affected aircraft procurement. On 1 April 1918, the RFC and the RNAS were amalgamated to form a new service, the Royal Air Force (RAF). The RAF was under the control of the equally new Air Ministry. By 1918, photographic images could be taken from 15,000 ft (4,600 m) and interpreted by over 3,000 personnel. Planes did not carry parachutes until 1918, though they had been available since before the war. After starting with some 2,073 personnel in 1914, the RAF had 4,000 combat aircraft and 114,000 personnel by the beginning of 1919.

=== Corps of Royal Engineers ===
On 1 August 1914, the Royal Engineers consisted of 25,000 officers and men in the regular army and reserves; by the same date in 1917, it had grown to a total of 250,000. In 1914, when the BEF arrived in France, there were two Engineer field companies attached to each infantry division, which was increased to three companies by September 1914. Each division also had a Signals company, which was responsible for communications between Corps, Division and Brigade headquarters.

Royal Engineer tunnelling companies were formed in response to the German blowing of 10 small mines in December 1914, at Givenchy. The first British mine was detonated at Hill 60 on 17 February 1915. Mining was used increasingly during the Battle of Aubers Ridge in May 1915, and the battle of Loos in September 1915. In July 1916, on the first day of the battle of the Somme, what became known as the Lochnagar Crater was created by a mine at La Boisselle.

Twenty-one companies were eventually formed and were employed digging subways, cable trenches, Sapping, dugouts as well as offensive or defensive mining. At the end of the war, Engineers were directly responsible for maintaining buildings and designing the infantry front-line fortifications and artillery positions, the telephones, wireless and other signalling equipment, railways, roads, water supply, bridges and transport. They also operated the railways and inland waterways.

=== Machine Gun Corps ===
In September 1915, the Machine Gun Corps (MGC) was formed to provide heavy machine-gun teams after a proposal was made to the War Office for the formation of a single specialist machine-gun company for each infantry brigade—a goal to be achieved by withdrawing guns and gun teams from the battalions. Created in October 1915, the MGC consisted of infantry machine-gun companies, cavalry machine-gun squadrons and motor machine-gun batteries. In the trenches, the Corps' guns were deployed with an interlocking field of fire and proved to be a devastating defensive weapon against attacking infantry. They were also used in an indirect fire support role, in which they fired over the heads and from the flanks of the advancing infantry and behind the German trenches to stop reinforcements and supplies from getting to the front.

=== Tank Corps ===
The Tank Corps was formed as the Heavy Section Machine Gun Corps in 1916. Tanks were used for the first time in action in the battle of the Somme on 15 September 1916. The intention being that they would crush the barbed wire for the infantry, then cross the trenches and exploit any breakthrough behind the German lines. In November 1916, they were renamed the Heavy Branch MGC and in June 1917, the Tank Corps.

Originally formed in Companies of the Heavy Branch MGC, designated A, B, C and D; each company of four sections had six tanks, three male and three female versions (artillery or machine guns), with one tank held as a company reserve. In November 1916, each company was reformed as a battalion of three companies, with plans to increase the Corps to 20 battalions, each Tank Battalion had a complement of 32 officers and 374 men.

Tanks were primarily used on the Western Front. The first offensive of the war in which tanks were used en masse was the battle of Cambrai in 1917; 476 tanks started the attack, and the German front collapsed. At midday the British had advanced five miles behind the German line. The battle of Amiens in 1918 saw the value of the tank being appreciated; 10 heavy and two light battalions of 414 tanks were included in the assault. 342 Mark Vs and 72 Whippets were backed up by a further 120 tanks designed to carry forward supplies for the armour and infantry.

By the end of the first day of the attack, they had penetrated the German line by 6–8 mi (9.7–12.9 km), 16,000 prisoners were taken. In September 1918, the British Army was the most mechanised army in the world. Some 22,000 men had served in the Tank Corps by the end of the war. A detachment of eight obsolescent Mark I tanks was sent to Southern Palestine in early 1917 and saw action against Turkish forces there.

=== Army Service Corps ===
The Army Service Corps (ASC) operated the transport system to deliver men, ammunition and matériel to the front. From 12,000 men at the start of the war, the Corps increased in size to over 300,000 by November 1918. In addition they had under command Indian, Egyptian, Chinese (Chinese Labour Corps) and other native labourers, carriers and stores men. They provided horsed and mechanical transport companies, the Army Remount Service and ASC Labour companies. In August 1914, they delivered 4,500,000 lb (2,000,000 kg) of bread to the front which increased to 90,000,000 lb (41,000,000 kg) by November 1918.

=== Royal Army Medical Corps ===
The Royal Army Medical Corps (RAMC) supplied the doctors, casualty evacuation, field ambulances and hospitals for the army. The Corps was assisted in its work by voluntary help from the British Red Cross, St John's Ambulance and the Friends Ambulance Unit. The only person to be awarded the Victoria Cross twice during the war was a doctor in the RAMC, Captain Noel Godfrey Chavasse, VC and Bar, MC. While not strictly a member of the RAMC, stretcher bearer Lance Corporal William Harold Coltman VC, DCM & Bar, MM & Bar, was the most decorated other rank of the war.

== Life in the trenches ==
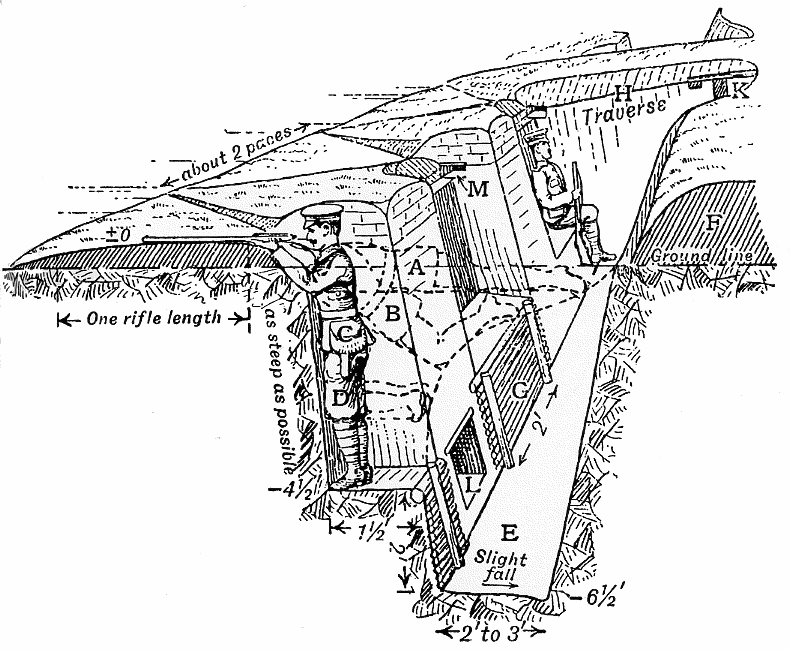
Trench construction diagram, from a 1914 British infantry manual

By the end of 1914, the war on the Western Front had reached stalemate and the trench lines extended from the Belgian coast to the Swiss frontier. By September 1915, the length of the British front line stretched some 70 mi (110 km). Soldiers were in the front or reserve line trenches for about eight days at a time, before being relieved.

There were three trenches in a typical front line sector; the fire trench, the support trench and the reserve trench, all joined by communication trenches. The trenches varied in depth, but they were usually about four or five feet deep, or in areas with a high water table a wall of sandbags would be built to allow the defenders to stand upright, fire trenches were provided with a fire step, so the occupants could return fire during an attack (see diagram). Ideally, the bottom of the trench was lined with duckboards to prevent men from sinking into the mud and dugouts were cut into the walls, these gave shelter from the elements and shrapnel, although in the British Army dugouts were usually reserved for the officers and senior NCOs. The men were then expected to sleep wherever they could and in wet weather they lived under groundsheets or in tents at the bottom of the trench on the duckboards.

At the front, soldiers were in constant danger from artillery shells, mortar bombs and bullets and as the war progressed they also faced aerial attack. Some sectors of the front saw little activity throughout the war, making life comparatively easy. Other sectors were in a perpetual state of violent activity. However, quiet sectors still amassed daily casualties through snipers, artillery fire and disease. The harsh conditions, where trenches were often wet and muddy and the constant company of lice and rats which fed on unburied bodies, often carried disease. Many troops suffered from trench foot, trench fever and trench nephritis.

They could also contract frostbite in the winter months and heat exhaustion in the summer. The men were frequently wet and extremely muddy, or dry and exceedingly dusty. Food could not usually be cooked in the front line trenches as any smoke would draw enemy fire, hot food had to be carried along communication trenches in clumsy "hayboxes", sometimes arriving late or not at all.

=== Daily routine ===
A sentry of the Cheshire Regiment in 1916. Note the four men sleeping in the trench

Daily routine of life in the trenches began with the morning 'stand-to'. An hour before dawn everyone was roused and ordered to man their positions to guard against a dawn raid by the Germans. With stand-to over, it was time for the men to have breakfast and perform ablutions. Once complete, the NCOs would assign daily chores, before the men attended to the cleaning of rifles and equipment, filling sandbags, repairing trenches or digging latrines. Once the daily tasks had been completed the men who were off-duty would find a place to sleep. Due to the constant bombardments and the sheer effort of trying to stay alive, sleep deprivation was common. Soldiers also had to take it in turns to be on sentry duty, watching for enemy movements.

Each side's front line was constantly under observation by snipers and lookouts during daylight; movement was therefore restricted until after the dusk stand-to and night had fallen. Under the cover of darkness, troops attended to vital maintenance and resupply, with rations and water being brought to the front line, fresh units swapped places with troops moving to the rear for rest and recuperation. Trench raiding was also carried out and construction parties formed to repair trenches and fortifications, while wiring parties were sent out to repair or renew the barbed wire in no man's land. An hour before dawn, everyone would stand-to once more.

=== Moving into the front line ===
A set procedure was used by a division that was moving into the front line. Once they had been informed that they were moving forward, the brigadiers and battalion commanders would be taken to the forward areas to reconnoiter the sections of the front that were to be occupied by their troops. Meanwhile, the battalion transport officers would be taken to the headquarters of the division that they were relieving to observe the methods used for drawing rations and ammunition, and the manner in which they were supplied to the troops at the front. Detachments from the divisional artillery group would move forward and were attached to the artillery batteries of the division they were relieving.

Five days later, the infantry battalions that were destined for the front line sent forward their specialists from the Lewis gun teams, and the grenade officer, the machine gun officer, the four company commanders, and some of the signallers to take over the trench stores and settle into the trench routine before the battalions moved in. Overnight, the battalions would move into the line, and the artillery would take over the guns that were already in position, leaving theirs behind to be taken over by the batteries that had been relieved.

== Discipline ==
=== Legal authority ===
The Army was ultimately under political authority. Since the Glorious Revolution of 1688 the Crown has not been permitted a standing army in the United Kingdom – it derived its existence from the Army Act, passed by Parliament each year. Most disciplinary regulations in the First World War derived from the 1881 Army Act, although some offences were more severely dealt with on active service, e.g. in principle looting or wilful disobedience carried the death penalty.

=== Lesser offences ===
Lesser offences were dealt with by commanding officers. For petty offences, a company commander could have men fined or confined to barracks for fatigue duty. A battalion Commanding Officer could give detention, order up to 28 days Field Punishment, or demote corporals to the ranks (officers and senior NCOs were dealt with by court martial other than for very trivial offences). Other ranks could also lose leave or seniority. Field punishment (FP) No.1 (in which the man was shackled to a fixed object, e.g. a large wheel) was awarded to 60,210 cases, equivalent to one man in 50 (although in practice there were many repeat offenders).

FP No.1 could be very unpleasant depending on the weather, was abhorred by some as barbaric, and in some units was ritualised (e.g. by locking a man in a shed and throwing the handcuffs in with him); there were also cases of Australian troops releasing British troops whom they found tied up, although in other units it was regarded as a necessary sanction for serious offences. FP No.2 meant that a man was shackled but not fixed in place. Striking an inferior was an offence but it was not uncommon in some units for officers to turn a blind eye to NCOs keeping discipline by violence, or even to do so themselves.

=== Courts martial ===
Men who committed serious offences were tried by Field General Court Martial, sometimes resulting in execution. Despite "assertions" that these were "kangaroo courts", the release of records in 1990–1994 showed that they in fact had strict rules of procedure and a duty to uncover the facts. Unlike a General Court Martial in peacetime, there was no legally qualified Judge-Advocate to advise the court, but from the start of 1916 a "Court Martial Officer" – usually an officer with legal experience in civilian life – was often present to do so. The accused was entitled to object to the composition of the panel (e.g. if one of the officers was connected with the case or had a poor relationship with the accused) and to present his case, defended by an officer (a "Prisoner's Friend") if he chose, although "Prisoners Friends" became more common as the war went on.

The officer who convened a court martial could not sit on it, and the most junior officer voted first (to lessen the chance of his deferring to a superior's opinion). However, the courts were explicitly intended to be "speedy" and were sometimes encouraged by higher authority to make an example of certain offences, and in practice the leniency of the court and the ability of the accused to defend himself varied widely. Some pleaded guilty or chose not to present a defence or call witnesses, and in most cases the offence was "so blatant that little defence could be put forward".

Eighty-nine per cent of courts martial returned a guilty verdict, the vast majority of cases being for offences such as Absence Without Leave (the most common offence), drunkenness and insubordination. Terms of imprisonment were often suspended, to discourage soldiers from committing an offence to escape the front lines, but also to give a convicted man a chance to earn a reprieve for good conduct. Of the 252 officers tried, 76 per cent were found guilty, the most common offence (52 per cent of cases) being drunkenness. Although three officers were executed, an officer was most likely to receive a severe reprimand (60 per cent of cases – a severe blow to his career) or be cashiered (30 per cent of cases – stripped of his commission, which brought total social disgrace and barred him from any employment under the Crown).

=== Executions ===
A death sentence had to be passed unanimously, and confirmed in writing by various officers as the verdict passed up the chain of command. A man's battalion and brigade commander tended to comment on his own record, but senior generals tended to be more concerned with the type of offence and the state of discipline in that unit. The Judge Advocate General at GHQ also checked the records for irregularities, before final confirmation by the Commander-in-Chief of the relevant theatre. Of the 3,080 men sentenced to death, 346 men were actually executed, the vast majority (266) for desertion, the next largest reasons for execution being murder (37 — these men would probably have been hanged under civilian law at the time) and cowardice (18). Convictions for mutiny were rare—only one man was shot for the Etaples disturbances in 1917. Of the men shot, 91 were already under a previous suspended sentence, and nine under two sentences. Of the 91, 40 were already under a suspended death sentence, 38 of them for desertion, and one man had already been "sentenced to death" twice for desertion.

It was felt at the time that an example needed to be made of men who deserted. Frontline soldiers sometimes felt that those who left their mates "in the lurch" by deserting "deserved to be shot". One historian writes that there is "virtually no evidence" that soldiers thought the death penalty unjust, although another writes that some soldiers deplored the death penalty, while most thought it justified. Desertion normally meant an absence of 21 days or other evidence to indicate intent of not returning. Those executed were normally not boys – the average age was in the mid-twenties and 40 percent had been in serious trouble before. Thirty percent were regulars or reservists, 40 percent were Kitchener volunteers, 19 percent were Irish, Canadian or New Zealand volunteers, but only nine percent were conscripts, suggesting indulgence to the conscripts.

Only executed men's records survive, so it is hard to comment on the reasons why men were reprieved. The policy of commuting 90 percent of death sentences may have been deliberate mercy in the application of military law designed for a small regular army recruited from the rougher elements of society. Only 7,361 of the 38,630 desertions were in the field. Most were away from the front line—14 of the executed deserters were arrested in the United Kingdom—and many deserters had never served in the front line. In the latter part of the war, executed men's families were usually told white lies by the authorities; their families received pensions, and the men were buried in the same graves as other dead soldiers. Of 393 men sentenced to death for falling asleep on sentry duty in all theatres in the First World War, only two were executed (sentries were usually posted in pairs to keep one another awake; these two, who served in Mesopotamia, were made an example of because they were found sitting asleep together, suggesting that they had colluded).

Australians made up seven percent of the British Expeditionary Force but 25 percent of deserters, while an Australian was nine times more likely to be imprisoned than a British soldier. Haig asked for permission to shoot Australians, but their government refused. British discipline of the First World War was not especially severe compared to most other armies of the time (e.g. the Russians and Italians). The French admitted to only 133 executions and the Germans 48, but these figures may not be reliable as both armies had problems with discipline.

=== Shell shock and pardons ===
At the time Posttraumatic stress disorder (known as "shell shock") was beginning to be recognised and was admissible in defence; it was classified as a war injury, although there were concerns that soldiers tried falsely to claim shell shock as a defence. One historian writes that "in no case was a soldier whom the medical staff certified as suffering from shell shock actually executed", that "there appear to have been very few cases where men who alleged shell shock, but whose claim was denied, were actually executed", and that the suggestions of modern campaigners that most of the executed men suffered from shell shock are "palpably untrue".

However, another historian has pointed out that there was a great deal of chance in whether a soldier's claim of shell-shock would be taken seriously, and gives examples of soldiers being given cursory medical examinations or none; specific references to shell-shock are uncommon, and records usually refer to dizziness, "queer turns", bad nerves etc. Such trauma was still poorly understood at that time. There were enquiries in 1919, 1922, 1925 and 1938, which examined documents now lost and witnesses now dead. The books "For the Sake of Example" (1983) by Babington and "Shot at Dawn" (1989) by Sykes & Putkowski were openly intended to start a campaign for pardons, though it was initially rejected. In 2006 all men were given pardons and recognised as victims of the First World War. However, their sentences were not overturned as it was impossible after this length of time to re-examine the evidence in every case.

=== Other discipline ===
There are only anecdotal accounts, and no figures, for men who were shot on the spot by officers and NCOs for "cowardice in the face of the enemy". There were over 13,000 Royal Military Police ("redcaps"). They were unpopular, at a time when the police were often unpopular with young men from big cities. Besides policing, a large part of their job was maintaining discipline on the march and keeping roads running smoothly, and collecting stragglers from a battle. During the March 1918 retreat 25,000 stragglers were rounded up and sent back to fighting units. Royal Military Police also fought on occasion if headquarters areas were threatened by an enemy advance. Soldiers sometimes told lurid tales of men who refused to fight being shot by Military Police. (Note: Private J. Kirkham of the 5th Manchester Pals (part of the 18th Division in the Montauban sector), told historian Martin Middlebrook such a story over fifty years later. Returning, wounded, from the front line on the First Day on the Somme, he passed two young soldiers who had been too terrified to attack. Two Royal Military Police with revolvers let him pass when he showed his wound, but behind him he heard two shots and was "sure" that the RMP had executed the youths. There are no reliable first-hand accounts of such events happening. There were occasional examples of men making unwanted homosexual advances, homosexuality being then criminal under both military and civil law, to escape the front lines, but prosecutions for this crime were rare, and there is also evidence of men turning a blind eye to homosexual relationships.)

=== Positive motivation ===
New medals were instituted: the Military Cross was created in December 1914 for warrant officers and officers up to captain, the Military Medal for other ranks in March 1916 (although it did not carry a cash bounty like the Distinguished Conduct Medal). The Order of the British Empire was instituted in 1917. By 1918, medals for bravery were often awarded within a week to ensure that the man lived long enough to receive it. Concert parties (including drag acts – good drag queens were in great demand), trips to the seaside and football matches were organised to keep men entertained. There were various unofficial publications, including the "Wipers Times". Overt patriotism was rare, and politicians such as (Prime Minister) H. H. Asquith and Ramsay MacDonald (an opponent of the war, later Labour Prime Minister) were satirised.

=== Morale Fragility 1917-18 ===
By the end of 1917, after the horrific conditions of the Battle of Passchendaele and the disappointing results of the Battle of Cambrai, and with neither victory nor an end to the war in sight, there was some evidence of morale problems in the BEF. By the end of 1917 the Cabinet Committee on Manpower were hearing about an alarming rise in drunkenness, desertions and psychological disorders, and reports of soldiers' returning from the front grumbling about "the waste of life" at Ypres.

Martin Middlebrook wrote that whereas officers who cracked up under the strain were often quietly reposted to duties away from the front line, this outlet was seldom available to "other ranks". By the end of 1917 there was a noticeable rise in self-inflicted wounds and men making themselves ill by sleeping in wet sheets or chewing cordite. It is hard to estimate the number of suicides as such men were generally listed as "Killed In Action". Middlebrook commented that it is hard to generalise about the state of British morale, as it varied a great deal between units, with former regular and territorial units probably retaining a core of motivated men. Whereas other armies had problems with discipline, apart from the Etaples mutiny British discipline generally held up, both in combat and out of it.

== Western Front ==
Under the command of Field Marshal Sir John French, the British Expeditionary Force (BEF) began to deploy to France within days of the declaration of war. The first encounter with the Germans came at Mons on 23 August 1914,after which the Allies began the Great Retreat, the BEF was involved in the Battle of Le Cateau. The BEF had a small role in halting the German advance at the First Battle of the Marne, before participating in the Aisne counter-offensive, in September which was followed by a period known as the "Race to the Sea" during which the BEF redeployed to Flanders. (Note: This name, the "Race to the Sea," which has stuck, nonetheless is actually something of a misnomer; because it was not so much a race to the sea as a succession of attempts to turn the flank of the other side, until ultimately, without a decision the front simply reached the English Channel and the North Sea.)

For the BEF, 1914 ended with "First Ypres" which marked the beginning of a long struggle for the Ypres Salient. British casualties in the fighting between 14 October and 30 November were 58,155 (7,960 dead, 29,562 wounded and 17,873 missing). It is often said that the pre-war professional army died at the First Battle of Ypres. The British Army had arrived in France with some 84,000 infantrymen. By the end of the battle, the BEF had suffered 86,237 casualties, mostly to the infantry.

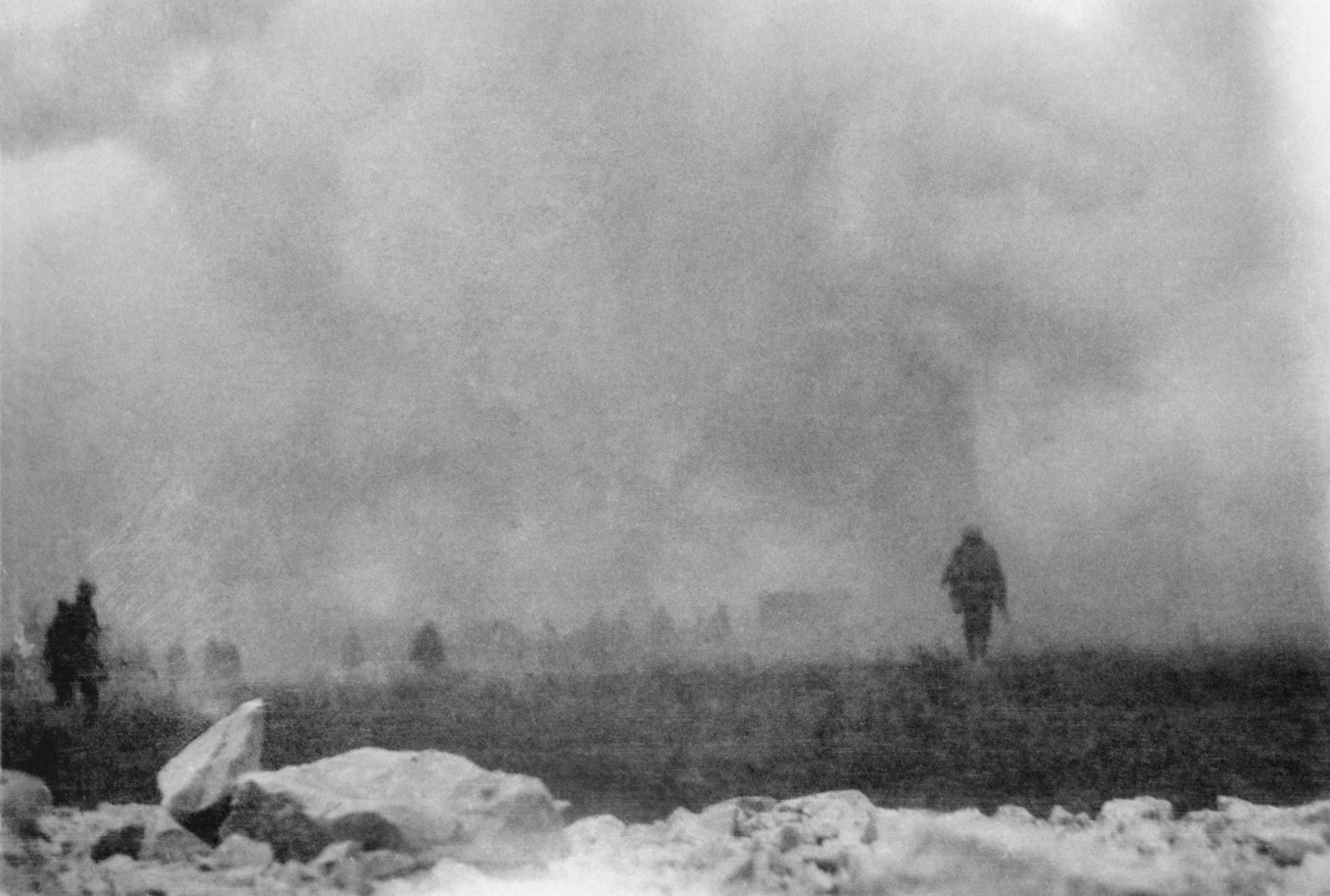
British infantry of the London Rifle Brigade advancing through gas during the Battle of Loos, 25 September 1915.

Trench warfare prevailed in 1915, and the BEF—as the junior partner on the Western Front—fought a series of small battles, at times coordinated with the larger French offensives, like the Battle of Neuve Chapelle which is always associated with the shell crisis, the Battle of Aubers Ridge, the Battle of Festubert in May and the Battle of Givenchy in June. On 22 April 1915, the German Army launched the Second Battle of Ypres, employing poison gas for the first time on the Western Front and capturing much of the high ground that ringed the salient. By September 1915, the BEF had grown in size with the first of the Kitchener's New Army divisions entering the line, and as part of the Third Battle of Artois, the BEF launched a major attack, the Battle of Loos, utilising its own newly developed chemical weapons for the first time. The resulting failure marked the end for Field Marshal French. On 19 December 1915, General Sir Douglas Haig replaced him as Commander-in-Chief (C-in-C) of the BEF.

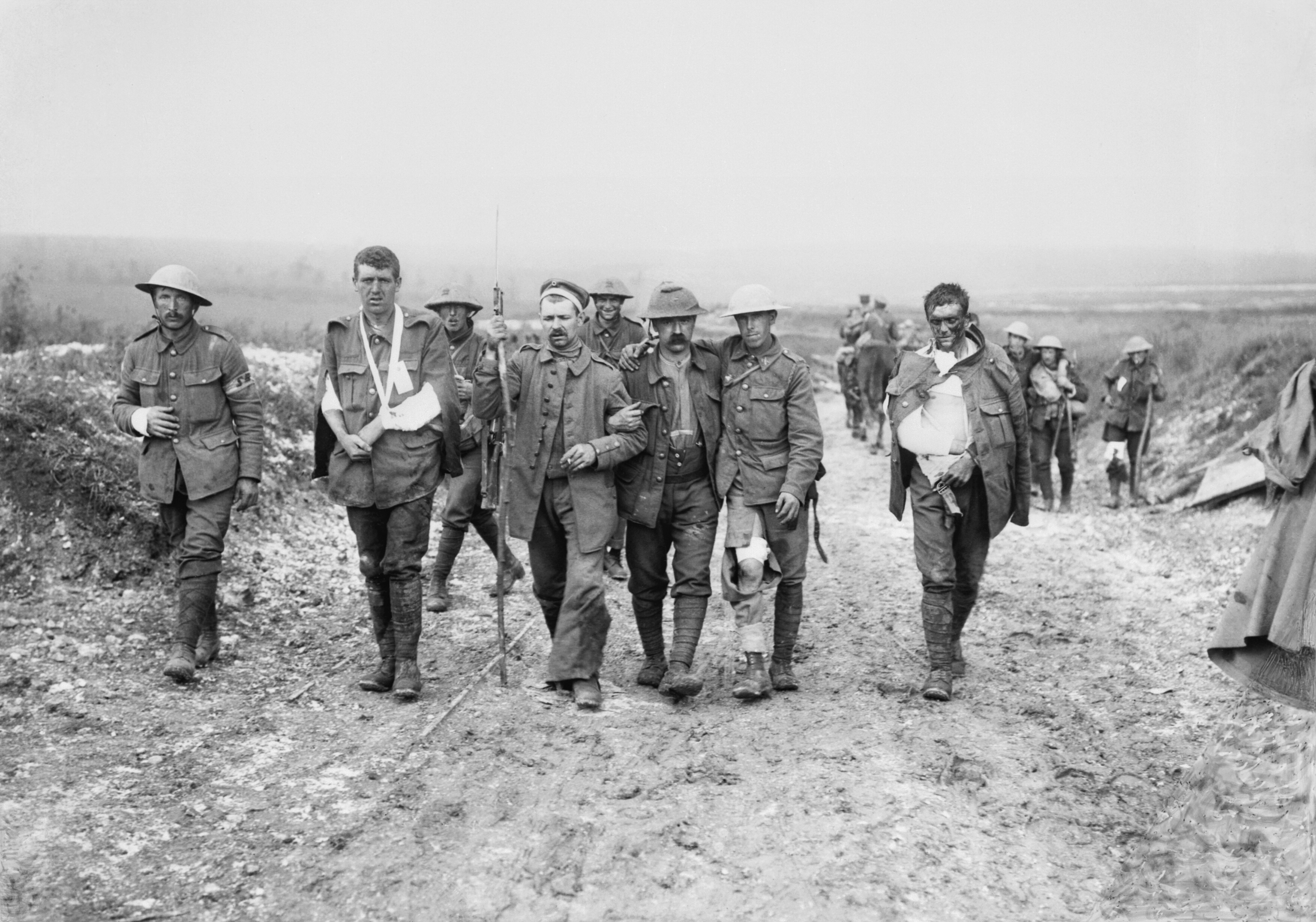
British wounded of the Royal Berkshire Regiment returning from fighting on Bazentin Ridge, July 1916. Photo by Ernest Brooks.

For the British Army, the year of 1916 was dominated by the Battle of the Somme which started disastrously on 1 July. The first day on the Somme remains the bloodiest day in the history of the British Army, with 19,240 British soldiers killed and 38,470 wounded or missing, all for little or no gain. The only real success was in the south where, using imaginative tactics and helped by the French, the New Army 18th and 30th Divisions took all their objectives, including Montauban, and the Regular 7th Division captured Mametz. At Thiepval, the 36th (Ulster) Division seized the Schwaben Redoubt but was forced to withdraw because of lack of progress elsewhere. There followed four-and-a-half months of attrition during which the Fourth Army of General Henry Rawlinson and the Fifth Army of General Hubert Gough advanced an average of 5 miles (8.0 km) at a cost of 420,000 casualties.

In February 1917, the German Army began to withdraw to the Hindenburg Line and it was these formidable defences that elements of the BEF assaulted in the Battle of Arras in April. For this battle, the Prime Minister—David Lloyd George—had placed Haig and the BEF under the orders of new French C-in-C (Robert Nivelle), who planned a major offensive in Champagne. When the battle officially ended on 16 May, British troops had made significant advances, but had been unable to achieve a major breakthrough at any point. Having failed to deliver a breakthrough, Haig now embarked on his favoured plan to launch an offensive in Flanders. In a successful preliminary operation, General Herbert Plumer's Second Army seized the Messines ridge south of Ypres. The Battle of Passchendaele (also known as the Third Battle of Ypres), which began on 31 July 1917, was one of the harshest ordeals endured by British and Dominion troops during the war, with the battlefield reduced to a quagmire. It was not until 6 November that Passchendaele ridge was captured, by which time the BEF had sustained around 310,000 casualties. The year of 1917, for the British Army, ended with the Battle of Cambrai which demonstrated the potential of tanks operating en masse. The Third Army commander—General Julian Byng—planned an ambitious breakthrough and achieved an unprecedented advanced of 5 miles (8.0 km) on the first day but lacked the reserves to either continue or consolidate. A German counter-offensive succeeded in recapturing most of the lost ground.

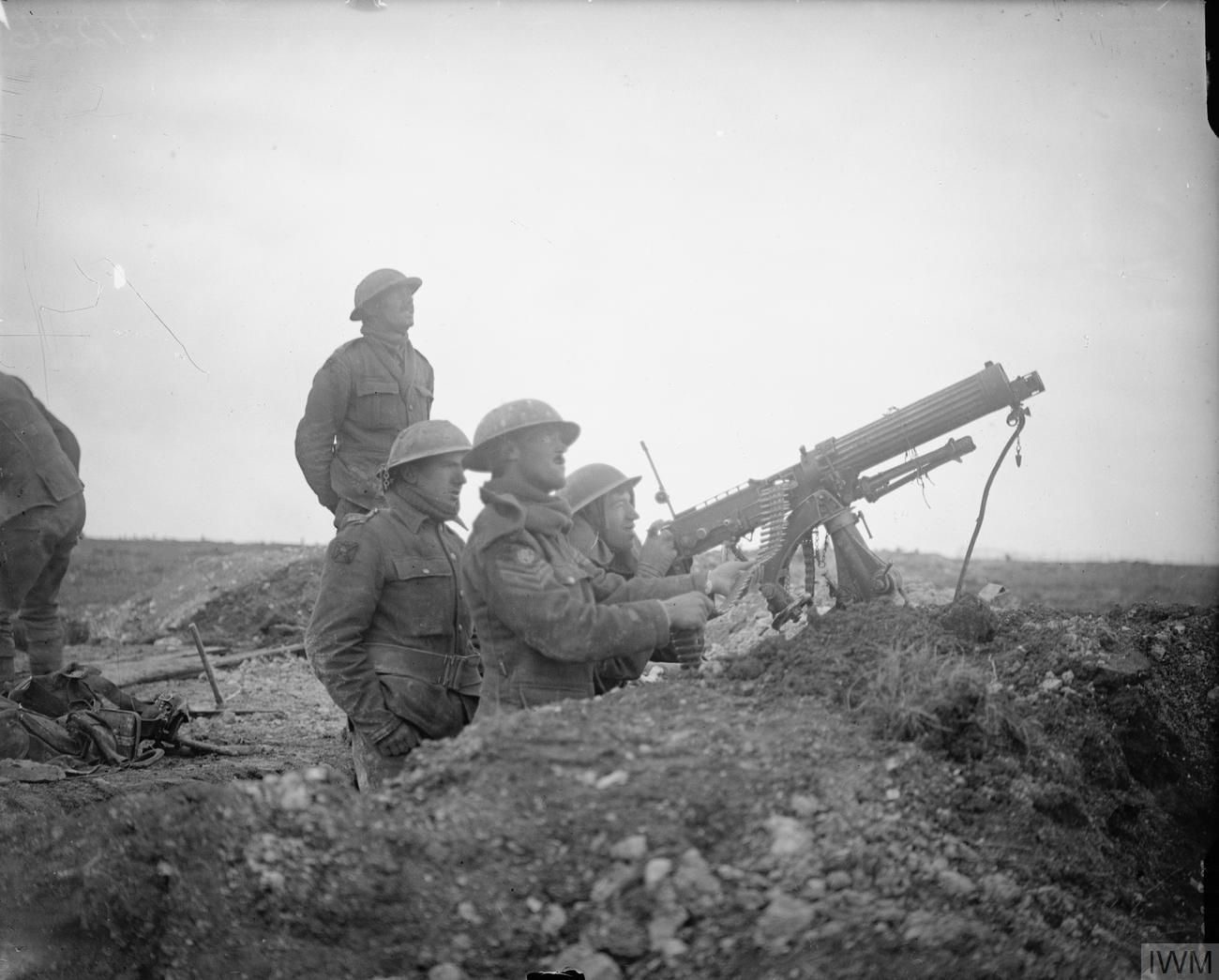
British machine gunners of the Machine Gun Corps fire on German aircraft near Arras, France, April 1917.

The final year of the war—1918—started with disaster and ended in triumph. On 21 March 1918, General Erich Ludendorff, Germany's Chief Quartermaster-General, launched the Spring Offensive, which was intended to defeat the Allies on the Western Front before the strength of the American Expeditionary Force (AEF) could become overwhelming. The main weight of the first blow—Operation Michael—fell on General Gough' s Fifth Army which was forced to retreat. In response to the crisis facing the Allies, French General Ferdinand Foch was made Generalissimo (Supreme Commander) of the Allied forces on the Western Front, placing the BEF under his strategic direction. The next German attack came south of Ypres in the Battle of the Lys river and here too the BEF fell back. Field Marshal Haig issued his famous Order of the Day, "With our backs to the wall and believing in the justice of our cause, each one of us must fight on to the end." A third major German offensive, falling mainly on the French, was finally halted on the Marne in June. On 8 August, General Rawlinson's Fourth Army launched the Battle of Amiens which marked the start of the Hundred Days Offensive, the final Allied offensive on the Western Front. Over the following weeks, all five armies of the BEF went on the offensive from the Somme to Flanders.Fighting continued right up until the Armistice with Germany came into effect at 11:00 am on 11 November 1918.

In the final offensives, the BEF had captured 188,700 prisoners and 2,840 guns which was only 7,800 prisoners and 935 guns less than those taken by the French, Belgian and American armies combined.

== Other campaigns ==
=== Ireland ===
The Easter Rising was a rebellion staged in Ireland during Easter Week, 1916. It was mounted by Irish republicans with the aims of ending British rule in Ireland and establishing an Irish Republic. Organised by the Military Council of the Irish Republican Brotherhood, the rising lasted from 24 to 30 April 1916. Members of the Irish Volunteers, joined by the smaller Irish Citizen Army, along with 200 members of Cumann na mBan, seized key locations in Dublin and proclaimed an Irish Republic independent of Britain.

Army reinforcements were moved into Dublin and, by 28 April, the 1,600 rebels were facing 18 to 20,000 soldiers, the rising was suppressed after seven days of fighting, its leaders were court martialled and executed. Easter Rising casualties were 450 killed, 2,614 wounded, and nine missing, almost all in Dublin. The only significant action elsewhere was at Ashbourne, 10 mi (16 km) north of Dublin. Military casualties were 116 dead, 368 wounded and 9 missing. The Irish and Dublin police forces had 16 killed and 29 wounded, 254 non-combatant civilians died.

=== Salonika ===
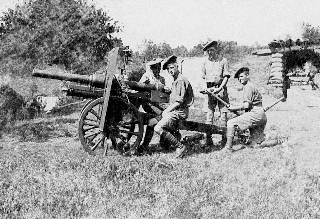
Men of the 4th (Highland) Mountain Brigade with a 2.75 in (70 mm) mountain gun, Salonika

A new front was opened in Salonika at the request of the Greek government, intending to support Serbian forces and oppose Bulgaria. The first troops of the British Salonika Army, arrived in Salonika in October 1916, too late to prevent the Serbian Army from retreating into Albania and Greece. French, British and Russian troops arrived in Salonika between 1916 and 1917 and became known as the Allied Army of the Orient or Allied Army of the East, under the overall command of French General Maurice Sarrail.

With the objective of destroying the Bulgarian Army, the French and British launched a new offensive in April 1917, without any significant success. A stalemate ensued without any movement by either side; the front became known as Europe's biggest internment camp for the Allies by the Germans. This situation lasted until 18 September 1918, when the British and Greek Armies, under the command of General George Milne attacked in the Lake Doiran Sector. The Bulgarian Army—now in retreat—signed an armistice on 30 September 1918.

=== Italy ===
Italy joined the war on the Allies' side on 5 May 1915, declaring war on Austria-Hungary on 23 May 1915 and on Germany on 28 August 1916. The British Army's involvement in the Italian campaign did not start until late 1917, when troops were sent to help prevent a defeat on the Italian front. On 24 October 1917 in the battle of Caporetto the Second Italian Army collapsed and the Italians were forced to retreat to the Piave River, where they could be reinforced with five British and six French Divisions from the Western Front, complete with supporting arms and commanded by General Herbert Plumer. The reinforced Italians successfully managed to halt the Austro-Hungarian advance at the battle of the Piave river. During the Allied counter-attack in October 1918, the Austro-Hungarian Army collapsed after taking heavy losses at the battle of Vittorio Veneto. An armistice was signed shortly afterwards on 3 November 1918.

=== China ===
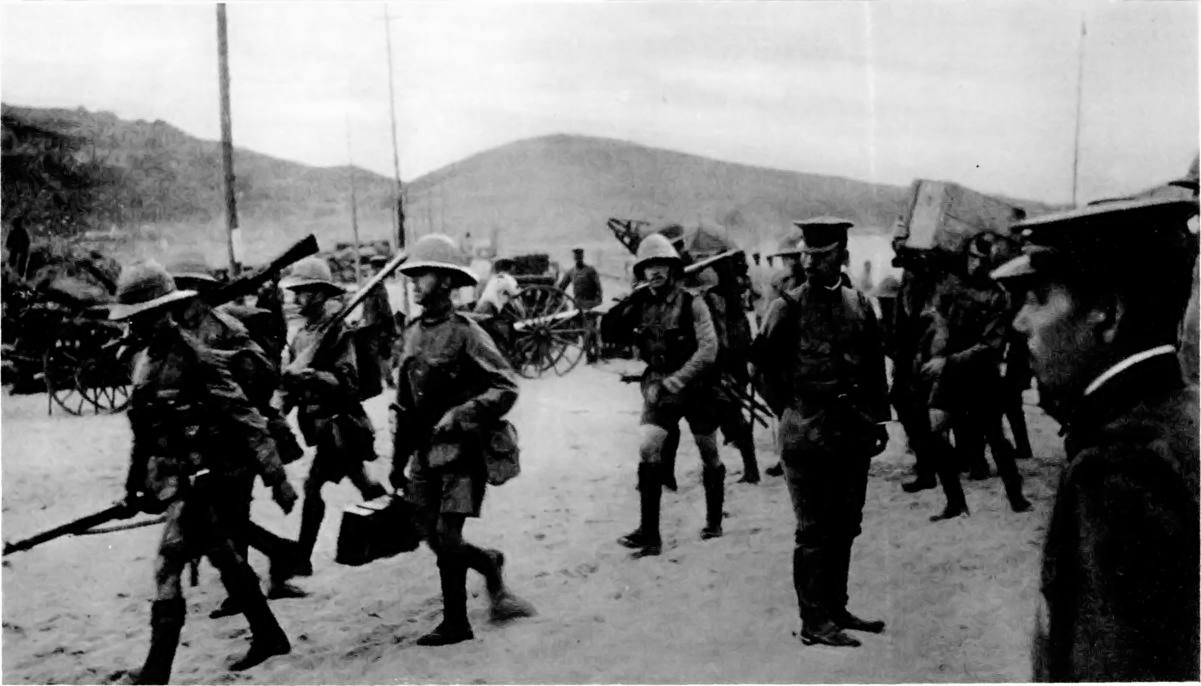
British troops arrive at Tsingtao 1914

In 1914, the British Army was involved in what became known as the Siege of Tsingtao when the 2nd Battalion South Wales Borderers landed in China in support of Japanese forces in the capture of the German port of Tsingtao. The British were part of a 23,000-strong task force which included a mixed British–Indian Brigade of 1,500 troops and the battleship HMS Triumph. A bombardment of the port started on 31 October 1914, and by 7 November, the Japanese 18th Division, 29th Infantry Brigade and the British–Indian Brigade, had stormed and captured the garrison and its 4,000 troops.

=== East Africa ===
1914 also witnessed the commencement of the East African Campaign against von Lettow-Vorbeck's elusive German and African askari forces. Most British operations in Africa were carried out by African askari units such as the King's African Rifles (KAR), South African or Indian Army units. The British force was led, in turn, by General Horace Smith-Dorrien, South African General Jan Smuts, and British General Arthur Reginald Hoskins. The force was composed of units of the KAR and the 27th Bangalore Brigade from the British Indian Army, with the 2nd Battalion, Loyal Regiment (North Lancashire) under command. The German forces of von Lettow-Vorbeck's Schutztruppe remained undefeated and surrendered on 25 November 1918, 14 days after the Armistice in Europe.

The casualty rate amongst British and Empire troops, excluding the Africans, was 6,000 dead and 3,000 wounded. More troops died from diseases than from enemy action, and illness accounted for 70% of the total casualties.

=== Gallipoli ===
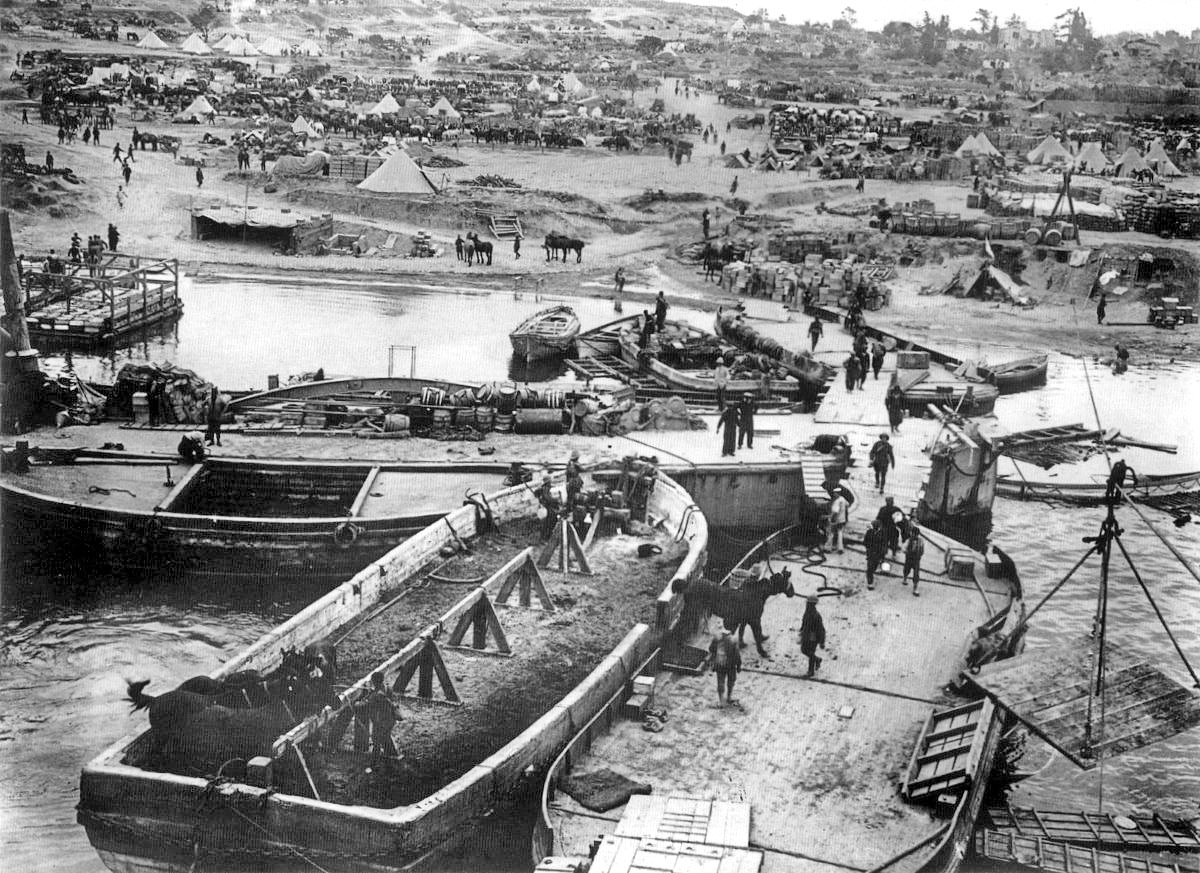
V Beach, Helles Gallipoli.

Turkey had entered the war on the German side on 31 October 1914. One of its first acts was to close the Dardanelles Straits to the Allies. In April 1915, following the failure of the Royal Navy's attempt to capture the Dardanelles, British and ANZAC forces landed on the Gallipoli peninsula, under the command of General Ian Hamilton. The main British attacks were the first, second and third battles of Krithia. These were a series of attacks against the Turkish defences aimed at capturing the original objectives of 25 April 1915. They all failed to achieve their objectives. In August, another landing was made at Suvla Bay. The Suvla landing was reinforced by the arrival of the 10th Division from Kitchener's New Army, 53rd, 54th first-line Territorial divisions and the dismounted yeomanry of the 2nd Mounted Division. The 29th Division was also moved from Helles to Suvla for one more push. The final British attempt to resuscitate the offensive came on 21 August, with attacks at Scimitar Hill and Hill 60. Control of these hills would have united the Anzac and Suvla fronts, but neither battle achieved success. When fighting at Hill 60 ceased on 29 August, the battle for the Sari Bair heights, and indeed, the battle for the peninsula, was effectively over; by January 1916, the Allies had withdrawn.

Estimates of casualties vary enormously, but of the around 480,000 Allied troops involved in the campaign, 180,000 were wounded and 44,000 died, 20,000 of the dead being British.

=== Mesopotamia ===
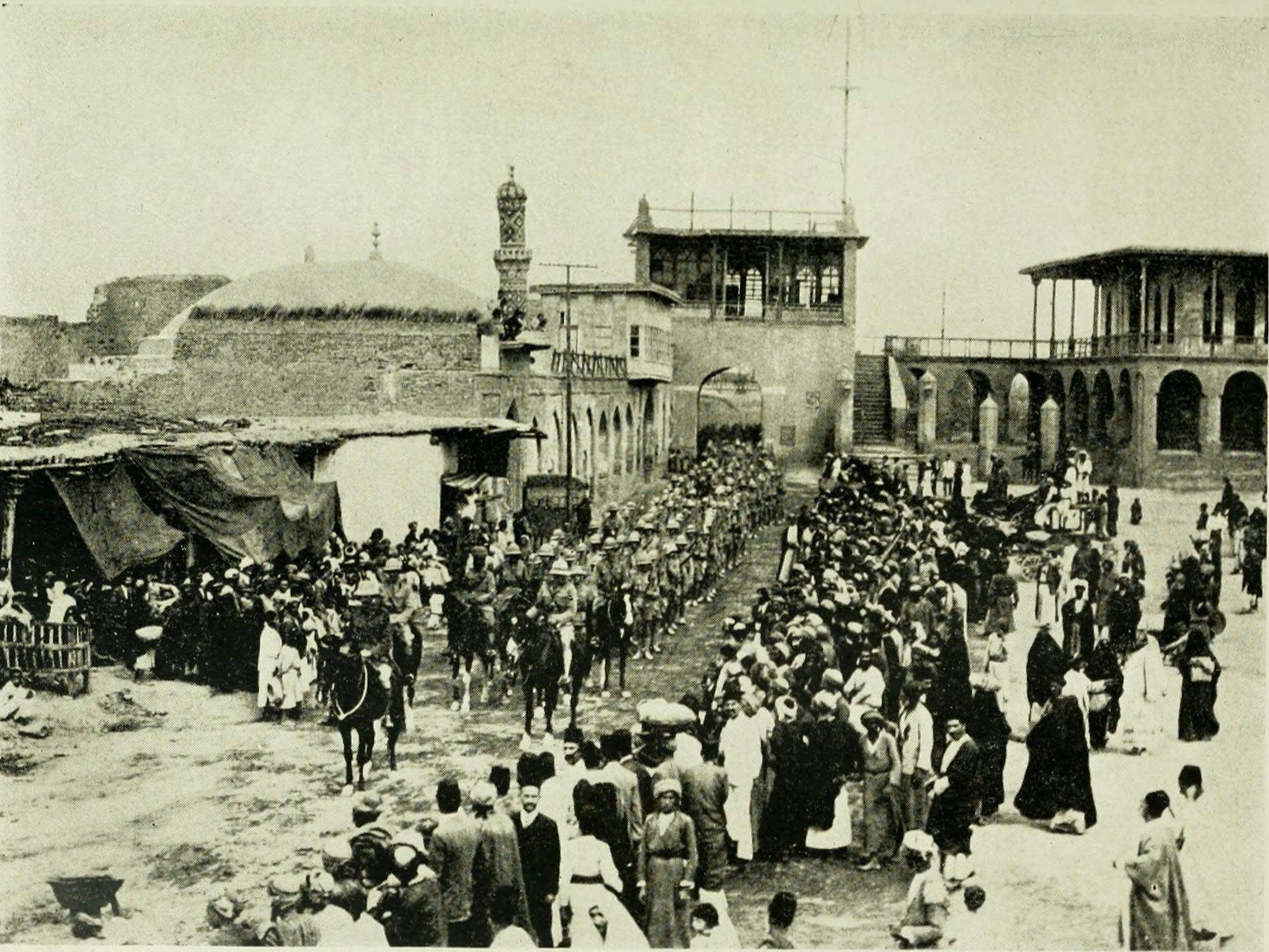
March 1917, British troops entering Baghdad.

The British force fighting in Mesopotamia was principally drawn from the British Indian Army, with only one solely British formation, the 13th (Western) Division. Its objective was to secure the Royal Navy's oil supply from Persia. On 7 November 1914, the British Indian force—led by General Sir John Nixon—invaded Mesopotamia, and on 23 November, entered Basrah. After this initial invasion, there followed a disastrous and humiliating defeat for the British by the Turks at the Siege of Kut-al-Amara from 7 December 1915 – 29 April 1916, when the entire garrison of 13,000 British and Indian troops surrendered. The British reorganised and raised the number of available troops to 250,000. The British eventually regained momentum upon General Frederick Stanley Maude becoming commander, and a new offensive began in December 1916. On 24 February 1917, Kut-al-Amara fell to the joint British and Indian force, and Baghdad was captured in March 1917. A week after the capture of Baghdad, General Maude issued the Proclamation of Baghdad, which contained the famous line, "our armies do not come into your cities and lands as conquerors or enemies, but as liberators". Lieutenant General Sir William Marshall succeeded Maude following the latter's death from cholera on 18 November 1917. He continued with the River War until October 1918, when the British captured the Mosul oil fields, a development that led to the collapse of the Turkish forces. The Armistice of Mudros with Turkey was signed on 30 October 1918. During the campaign, 100,000 British and Indian casualties were caused. Of these, 53,000 died, with 13,000 of the dead succumbing to disease.

=== Sinai and Palestine ===
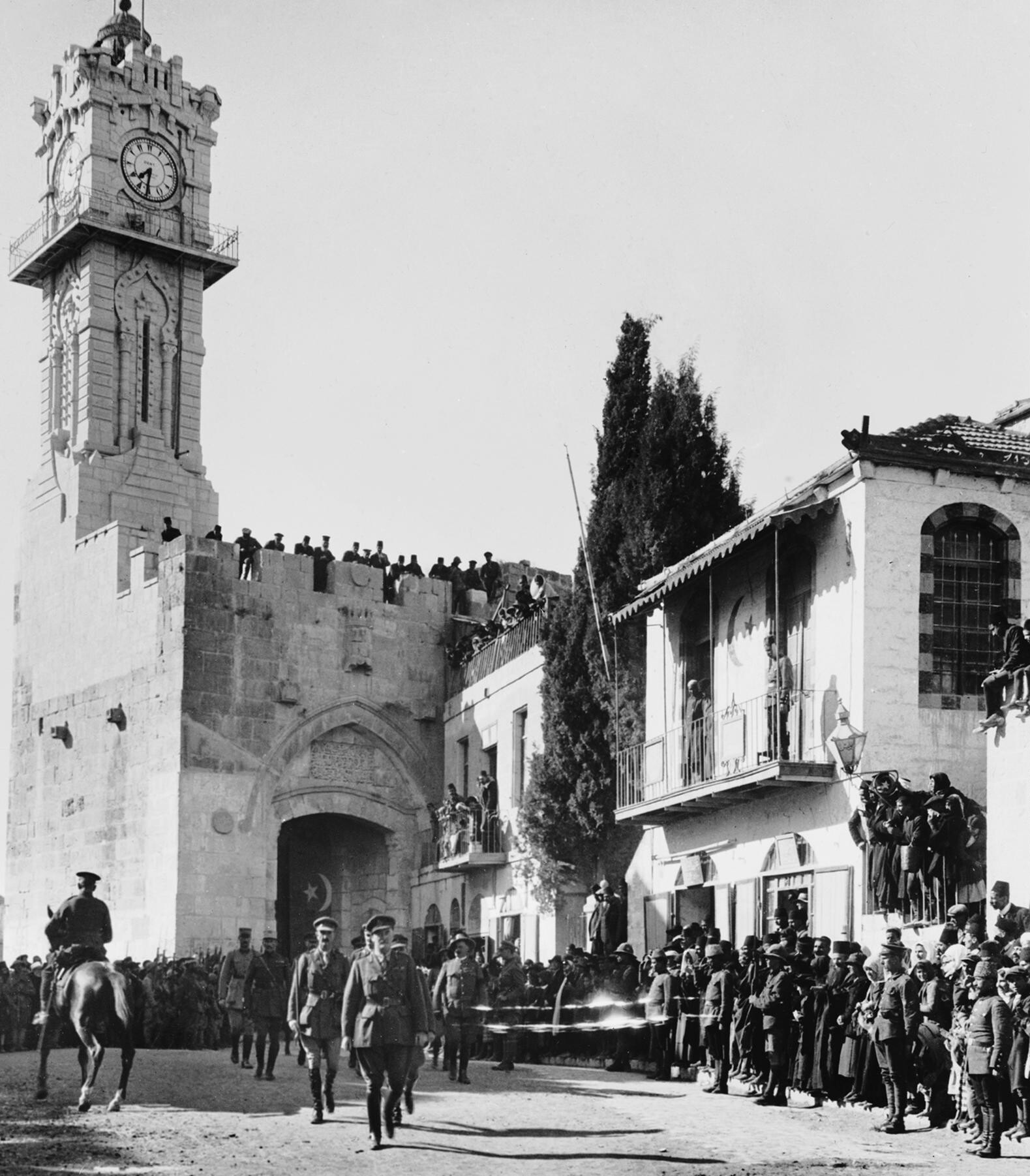
General Edmund Allenby, enters Jerusalem on foot out of respect for the Holy City, 31 December 1917

The Sinai and Palestine Campaign was fuelled by criticism of the policy of a static defence of the Suez canal, which employed six infantry divisions and five mounted brigades. After the repulse of the Turkish First Suez Offensive, nine divisions were sent to the Western Front and one to Mesopotamia.

The British Army in the Sinai and Palestine subsequently included the 10th, 42nd, 52nd, 53rd, 54th, 60th, 74th and 75th divisions. British yeomanry formed part of the ANZAC Mounted Division, Australian Mounted Division and Yeomanry Mounted Divisions. With the Imperial Camel Corps Brigade, mounted troops formed the Desert Column. The whole force—known as the Egyptian Expeditionary Force (EEF)—was under the command of General Sir Archibald Murray in Cairo.

Murray made steady progress against the Turkish forces, which were defeated in the battles of Romani, Magdhaba and Rafa. However, he was repulsed at the first and second battle of Gaza in 1917. The defeat in the Second Battle of Gaza prompted the War Office to change the command of the EEF, and on 28 June 1917, Murray was replaced by General Sir Edmund Allenby, who reinvigorated the campaign.

Allenby reorganised his forces along more conventional lines. The EEF now included the Desert Mounted Corps, under Lieutenant General Sir Harry Chauvel; XX Corps under Lieutenant General Sir Phillip Chetwode and XXI Corps under Lieutenant General Edward Bulfin. In October 1917, they defeated the Turkish forces in the third battle of Gaza and the Battle of Mughar Ridge, which succeeded in causing the Ottoman Seventh and Eighth Armies to withdraw towards Jerusalem and Haifa respectively. This led to the capture of Jerusalem in December 1917.

In February and April 1918, Australian mounted troops took part in two raids east across the Jordan River near Es Salt, a village in Palestine 14 mi (23 km) west of Amman. Although these raids were unsuccessful, they encouraged Turkish commanders to believe that the main British effort would be launched across the Jordan, when in fact it would be launched along the coastal plain. The EEF was greatly weakened at this time by the crisis in France, which led to the despatch of the 52nd and 74th Divisions to the Western Front, the breaking up of the Yeomanry Mounted Division, and the replacement of most of the British infantry in four of the remaining divisions with Indian troops. In September 1918, Allenby's forces won the decisive Megiddo Offensive, which precipitated the Armistice of Mudros with the Ottoman Empire, which was signed on 31 October 1918.

Total Allied casualties in the Sinai and Palestine campaign were 60,000 of which 20,000 were killed. Some 15,000 of the dead were British.

=== Persia ===
Following the abdication of the Russian Tsar in 1917, the Caucasus Front collapsed, leaving Central Asia—and beyond it India—open to the Turkish Army. The War Office responded with a plan to send a force of hand-picked British officers and NCOs to organise any remaining Russian forces or civilians who were ready to fight the Turkish forces. This force became known as Dunsterforce after its commander, Major General Lionel Charles Dunsterville, the inspiration for the titular character of Rudyard Kipling's novel Stalky & Co. It arrived in Baku in August 1918. It was hoped that Dunsterforce could raise an army from the Christian Georgian, Armenian and Assyrian people who had supported the Russians and had historically feared the Turks. While Dunsterforce had some success the task proved beyond its ability.

=== Fighting the Senussi Arabs ===
In late November 1915, in response to the growing threat from a pro-Turkish Islamic Arab sect known as the Senussi, a composite British body known as the 'Western Frontier Force' was sent into the Libyan Desert to Mersa Matruh, under the command of British Indian Army officer Major General Alexander Wallace. A series of sharp battles against the Arabs ensued at Um Rakhum, Gebel Medwa, and Halazin during December and January. The Western Desert Force, now under Major General William Peyton, re-occupied Sidi Barrani and Sallum in February and March 1916. Shipwrecked British seamen from HMT Moorina and HMS Tara, who had been held at Bir Hakeim, were rescued by a contingent of armoured cars led by the Duke of Westminster.

== Aftermath ==
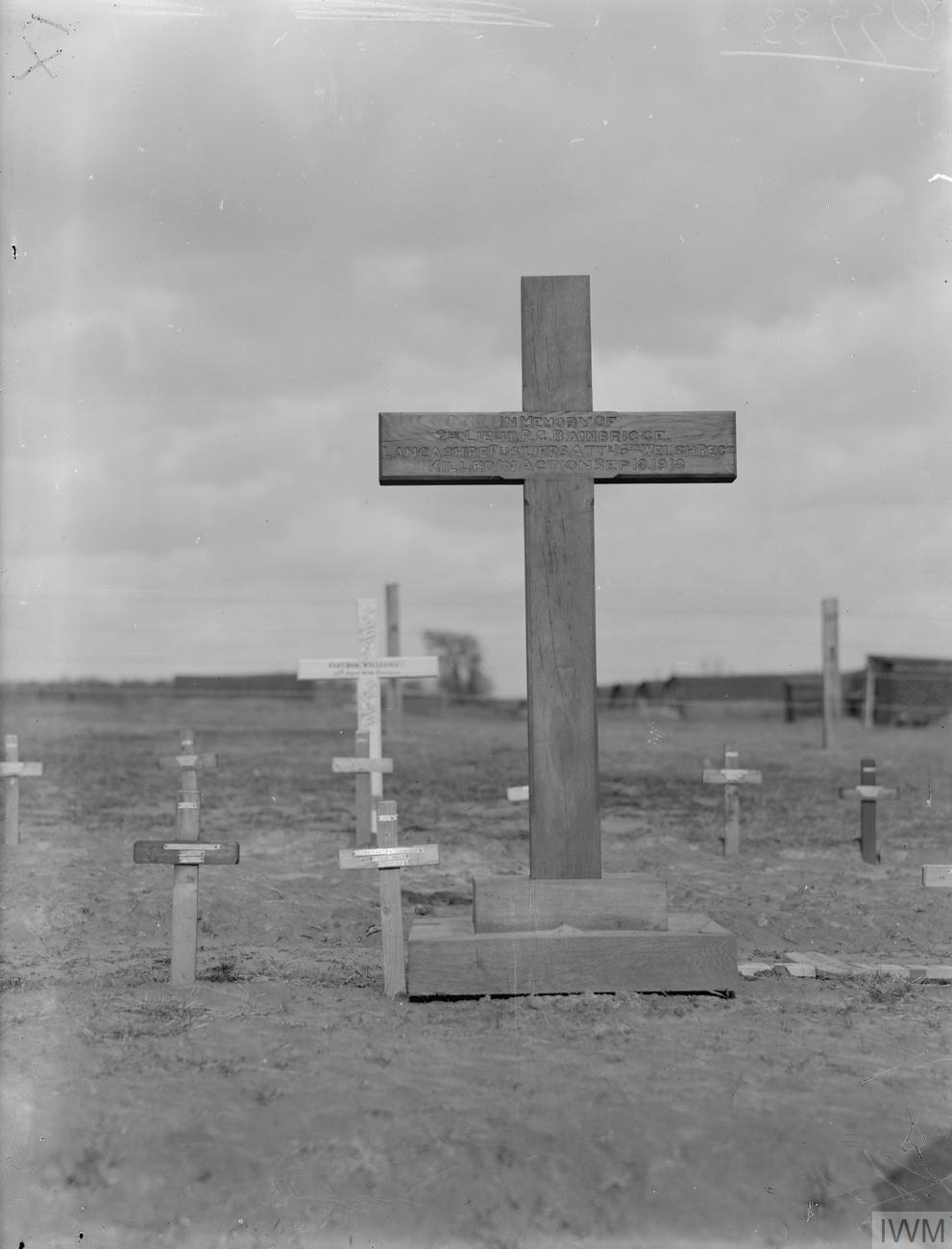
Grave of Second Lieutenant Philip Gillespie Bainbrigge of the 5th Battalion, Lancashire Fusiliers, attached to the 16th (Service) Battalion, Royal Welsh Fusiliers, killed in action on 18 September 1918, amongst other graves near Lechelle.

The British Army during the First World War was the largest military force that Britain had put into the field up to that point. On the Western Front, the British Expeditionary Force ended the war as the strongest fighting force, more experienced than the United States Army and its morale was in better shape than the French Army. (Note: By November 1918, the U.S. Army, with ration strength of 2 million men, exceeded the BEF both in size and percentage of the front occupied.(Stevenson 2011 pp. 245, 249, 269) BEF ration strength peaked at 1.9 million at the start of September 1918 (after the redeployment of troops from Palestine and Italy after the German spring offensives), but had dropped to 1.86 million at the war's end. Following the extension of the British line early in 1918, the BEF occupied 24.8% of the front in March, but after the deployment of U.S. troops this dropped to 17.3% in July and remained at 17.6% in November. The U.S. sector was 3.7% of the front in March, 11.7% in July and 20.9% in November. The French sector was 66.6% in March and July, but had dropped to 55.3% in November, freeing up French reserves for an offensive into Lorraine, which was cancelled because of the armistice.(Boff 2012 pp. 40–422) Many of an Army's ration strength were labourers and logistical personnel, and just over half were combat troops (of whom a decreasing proportion were infantry as the war progressed). By the end of the war, the BEF "field strength", at 1.202m, still fractionally exceeded the U.S. (1.175m), but was still less than the French 1.554m (French field strength was down from a peak of over 2.2m in July 1916).(Watson 2008, p. 157))

The cost of victory, however, was high. The official "final and corrected" casualty figures for the British Army—including the Territorial Force—were issued on 10 March 1921. The losses for the period between 4 August 1914 and 30 September 1919 included 573,507 "killed in action, died from wounds and died of other causes" and 254,176 missing (minus 154,308 released prisoners of war), for a net total of 673,375 dead and missing. Casualty figures also indicated that there were 1,643,469 wounded. For some, the fighting did not end in 1918. The British Army dispatched troops to Russia during the Allied intervention in the Russian Civil War, which was followed by the Anglo-Irish War in January 1919 and the Third Anglo-Afghan War in May 1919. The Third Afghan War was followed by the 1920 conflict between British forces and Somaliland dervishes. Those not involved in fighting or occupation duties were demobilised. The demobilisation of 4,000,000 men that followed the end of the war had, within a year, reduced the British Army to 800,000 men; by November 1920, two years after the signing of the Armistice, this figure had fallen to 370,000 men.

The Ten Year Rule was introduced in August 1919, which stipulated that the British Armed Forces should draft their estimates "on the assumption that the British Empire would not be engaged in any great war during the next ten years". In 1928, Winston Churchill, as Chancellor of the Exchequer, successfully urged the Cabinet to make the rule self-perpetuating and hence it was in force unless specifically countermanded. There were cuts in defence spending as a result of this rule, falling from £766 million in 1919–1920, to £189 million in 1921–1922, and to £102 million in 1932. The British Army tried to learn the lessons of the First World War, and adopt them into its pre-war doctrine. In the 1920s, and much of the 1930s, the General Staff tried to establish a small, mechanised, professional army and formed the Experimental Mechanized Force but, with the lack of any identified threat, its main function reverted to garrison duties around the British Empire.
