= British rearmament before World War II =

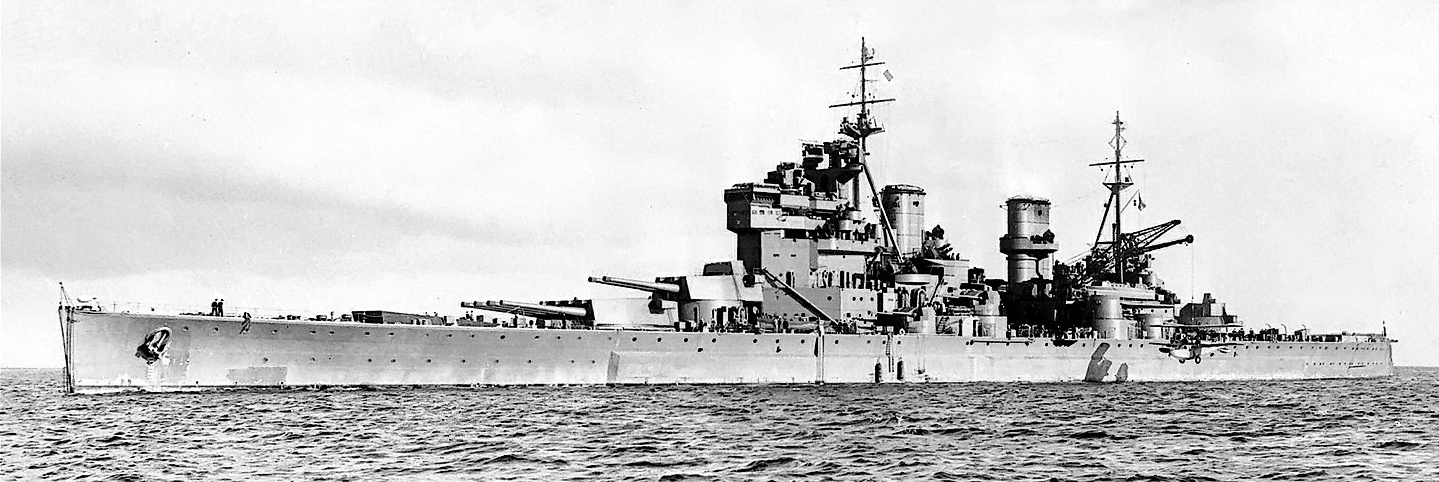
HMS Prince of Wales, ordered in 1936, as part of the rearmament programme.

British rearmament was a period in British history, between 1934 and 1939, when a substantial programme of rearming the United Kingdom was undertaken. Rearmament was deemed necessary, because defence spending had gone down from £766 million in 1919–20, to £189 million in 1921–22, to £102 million in 1932.

== Ten Year Rule ==
After World War I, dubbed "The War To End All Wars” and "The Great War", Britain (along with many other nations) had wound down its military capability. The Ten Year Rule said that a "great war" was not expected in the next ten years with the belief in its impossibility and the folly of preparing for it. Britain, therefore, made almost no investment at all in the development of new armament. The British Admiralty, however, requested the suspension of this rule when Japan invaded Manchuria in 1931. The policy was officially abandoned on 23 March 1932 by the Cabinet, four months before Adolf Hitler's Nazis became the largest party in the German Reichstag. A statement released cautioned that the decision was not an endorsement of increased armament spending, citing the grave economic situation in Britain and also indicating the British commitment to the arms limitations being promoted by the World Disarmament Conference, an event coinciding with the announcement.

There are sources who describe the British rearmament immediately after the abrogation of the Ten Year Rule as uncertain, hovering between disarmament and rearmament. Even after the collapse of the League of Nations in 1935, the rearmament policy had been tempered by appeasement.

== Collapse of international disarmament ==
Germany was not considered a threat during the 1920s, but the situation changed radically when Hitler came to power in 1933 and withdrew Germany from the League of Nations and the Geneva Disarmament conference.

In October 1933, when the failure of the Disarmament Conference was evident, a Defence Requirements Sub-Committee (DRC) of the Committee of Imperial Defence was appointed to examine the worst deficiencies of the armed forces. The group first considered the Far East, but soon looked at dangers nearer home.

The DRC was created on 14 November 1933, as "the arena in which British strategic foreign policy was thrashed out among competing interests with competing views". Between November 1933 and July 1934 it set the UK's strategic priority as being to avoid conflict with Japan and concentrate on Germany as the main threat.

The DRC's initial proposal was to spend £71m on rearmament over the next five years (1934–39) in order to re-equip the British Army for combat in Europe. However the Treasury forced the plan's reduction to £50m, halving the Army's expansion budget and doubling that of the Royal Air Force. Its primary aim was to deter German aggression by building a modernised air force. The DRC set the focus of UK strategy throughout the early years of rearmament, leading to continuous tension between the three armed services, the Treasury and the Foreign Office.

== Rearmament ==
Government-backed "Shadow Factories", generally privately owned but subsidised by the government, were established to increase the capacity of private industry; some were also built by the government.

=== Royal Air Force ===
In 1918 the new Royal Air Force had 290,000 personnel and around 23,000 aircraft. In the mid-1930s, the Royal Air Force's front-line fighters were biplanes, little different from those employed in World War I. The rearmament program enabled the RAF to acquire modern monoplanes, like the Hawker Hurricane and Supermarine Spitfire, such that sufficient numbers were available to defend the UK in the Battle of Britain in 1940, during the early stages of World War II.

=== Royal Navy ===
Rearmament also led to the Royal Navy acquiring five new battleships of the King George V class, and modernising existing battleships to varying extents. Whereas ships such as HMS Renown and HMS Warspite were completely modernised, others such as HMS Hood, the Nelson class, the Revenge class, HMS Barham, and HMS Repulse were largely unmodernised – lacking improvements to horizontal armour, large command towers and new machinery.

Equally importantly, aircraft carriers of the Illustrious class and a series of large cruiser classes were ordered and expedited. Britain also accelerated building programmes such as the Singapore Naval Base, which was completed within three and a half years instead of five.

=== British Army ===
The British Army was supplied with modern tanks and weapons, for example howitzers, and the Royal Ordnance Factories were equipped to mass-produce munitions.

== See also ==
- German rearmament
- Ten Year Rule
