= Ten Year Rule =

British governmental policy

The Ten Year Rule was a British government guideline, first adopted in August 1919, that the armed forces should draft their estimates "on the assumption that the British Empire would not be engaged in any great war during the next ten years".

The suggestion for the rule came from Winston Churchill, who in 1919 was Secretary of State for War and Air. In a Commons debate in August 1919, Prime Minister David Lloyd George referenced recommendations made by the Duke of Wellington following the end of the Napoleonic Wars: "There is not likely to be great eagerness for war in this generation."

Former Prime Minister Arthur Balfour rejected the proposal but unsuccessfully argued to the Committee of Imperial Defence, which adopted the rule, that "nobody could say that from any one moment war was an impossibility for the next ten years ... we could not rest in a state of unpreparedness on such an assumption by anybody. To suggest that we could be nine and a half years away from preparedness would be a most dangerous suggestion."

In 1928 Churchill, as Chancellor of the Exchequer, successfully urged the Cabinet to make the rule self-perpetuating, and hence it was in force unless specifically countermanded. In 1931 the Prime Minister Ramsay MacDonald wanted to abolish the Ten Year Rule because he thought it unjustified based on the international situation. This was bitterly opposed by the Foreign Secretary Arthur Henderson who succeeded in keeping the rule.

There were very large cuts in defence spending as a result of this rule, with defence spending going down from £766 million in 1919–20, to £189 million in 1921–22, to £102 million in 1932. In April 1931 the First Sea Lord, Sir Frederick Field, claimed in a report to the Committee of Imperial Defence that the Royal Navy had declined not only in relative strength compared to other Great Powers but "owing to the operation of the 'ten-year-decision' and the clamant need for economy, our absolute strength also has ... been so diminished as to render the fleet incapable, in the event of war, of efficiently affording protection to our trade". Field also claimed that the navy was below the standard required for keeping open Britain's sea communications during wartime and that if the navy moved to the East to protect the Empire there would not be enough ships to protect the British Isles and its trade from attack and that no port in the entire British Empire was "adequately defended".

The Ten Year Rule was abandoned by the Cabinet on 23 March 1932, but this decision was countered with: "this must not be taken to justify an expanding expenditure by the Defence Services without regard to the very serious financial and economic situation" which the country was in due to the Great Depression.

== Recent reference ==
In 2010, the Royal Navy decided to retire HMS Ark Royal, Britain's only aircraft carrier, in 2011. This was five years earlier than previously planned and up to ten years before the planned entry into service of the new Queen Elizabeth-class aircraft carriers. A group of retired admirals criticized the decision, calling it a new "10-year rule".

== See also ==
- British re-armament
- Prime Minister's Review: Reduction in Armaments, House of Commons Debate, 18 August 1919 (rtrvd Oct 22)
