= Haldane Reforms =

Reforms of the British Army from 1906 to 1912

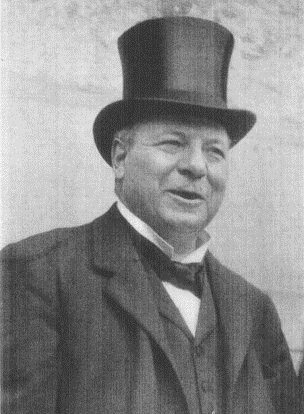
Sir Richard Haldane

The Haldane Reforms were a series of far-ranging reforms of the British Army made from 1906 to 1912, and named after the Secretary of State for War, Richard Burdon Haldane. They were the first major reforms since the "Childers Reforms" of the early 1880s, and were made in the light of lessons newly learned in the Second Boer War.

The major element of the reforms was the creation of an expeditionary force, specifically prepared and trained for intervening in a major war. This had existed before, but it had not been well-prepared for overseas service; the newly organised force was to have a permanent peacetime organisation and a full complement of supporting troops. At the same time, the reserve forces were restructured and expanded so as to ensure that overseas forces could be expanded, supplied with new recruits and to provide for home defence. The Volunteer Force and the Yeomanry were reorganised into a new Territorial Force and the Militia was formed into the Special Reserve; these latter two reforms were grouped together in the Territorial and Reserve Forces Act 1907. To encourage the development of military skills, an Officer Training Corps was established in public schools and universities. Taken together these measures were designed to bring the Army and wider public closer together, to deliver Haldane's vision of a 'nation in arms'. Military strategy was revitalised by a new Imperial General Staff, which would ensure a common doctrine and common strategic aims among the various military forces of the British Empire, including the Dominions as well as British India. Finally, the Regular Army itself would be reformed by the development of a new operational and training doctrine, laid down in Douglas Haig's new Field Service Pocket Book.

The outbreak of the First World War in August 1914 saw the bulk of the changes put to the test; the Expeditionary Force was quickly sent to the Continent, whilst the Territorial Force and Reserves were mobilised and several divisions deployed, as Haldane had envisaged, to provide a second line.

== Background ==
In the middle of the 19th century, the British Army had seen two major operations in close succession – the Crimean War and the Indian Mutiny – and it had become apparent that the existing organisation of the forces was not sufficient for large-scale modern warfare. The first wave of reforms was from 1858 to 1860. This period saw the creation of the Staff College, which helped to turn officers in the upper reaches of the Army into professional soldiers; the transformation of the old East India Company army into the Indian Army to better control the forces in India; and the creation of the Volunteer Force to help with home defence whilst the Regular Army was overseas.

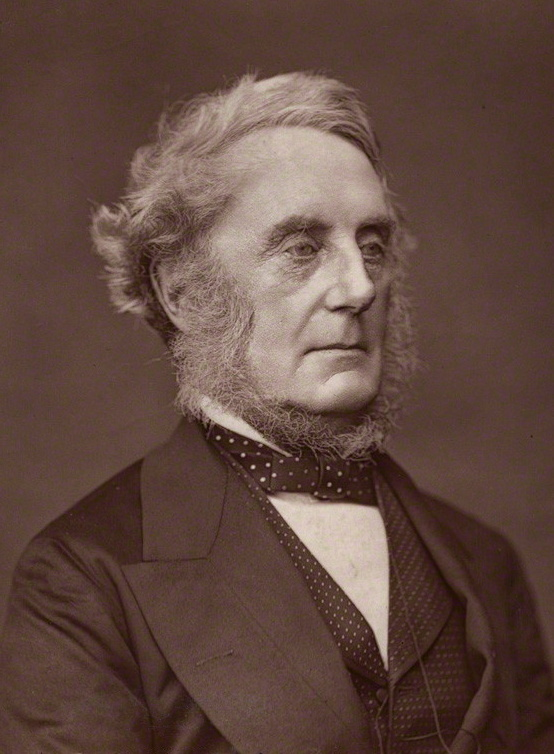
Edward Cardwell, 1st Viscount Cardwell

The second wave was from 1868 to 1872, comprising a collection of administrative changes popularly known as the "Cardwell Reforms" after the then Secretary of State for War, Edward Cardwell. The purchase of commissions by officers was abolished, and recruits were now taken on for a short enlistment in a specified regiment or corps rather than the (unpopular) system of twenty-one-year general service enlistments. These measures at a stroke increased the quality of the manpower of the Army, and provided for a trained and efficient reserve of veterans which could be recalled to the colours in an emergency. A further part of the reforms was the reorganisation of the regimental system, linking "territorial" (line) regiments in paired regimental depots with a territory-based recruiting area for simplified recruitment and training and bringing volunteer regiments into the regimental structure.

The third set of reforms was the "Childers Reforms" (again named after the Secretary of State who carried them out) of the early 1880s, which carried through the Cardwell regimental reorganisations to their logical end by completing the amalgamation of linked regiments into single two-battalion regiments along with the local units of militia and volunteers.

The result of these reforms was to provide a sizeable, well-trained force in the British Isles, which could be sent overseas in time of crisis, with a system of reservists and home-service volunteers to support it. On the outbreak of the South African War in October 1899, Britain was able rapidly to assemble and effect the biggest deployment of British troops since the Crimea, eventually involving half a million soldiers, including volunteers from Canada, Australia and New Zealand. Nevertheless, the system immediately began to show some strain; by the end of the first year of fighting, the Regular Reserve and the Militia Reserve had been entirely exhausted. (Regular reservists were members of the Regular Army who had retired from the active-duty portion of their service but remained available for callout. The Militia Reserve was a pool of individuals within the Militia, who accepted an overseas service liability, numbering over 31,000 on the eve of the South African War). Various novel measures, including the extensive use of auxiliary forces, were experimented with for the remainder of the war; the Militia provided garrison units to free up regulars, the Volunteers sent service companies to be attached to regular battalions, and the Imperial Yeomanry was created to supply much-needed mounted infantry. Substantial detachments, mainly auxiliary forces, were provided by the dominions, with soldiers from Canada, Australia and New Zealand as well as South Africa itself.

A number of half-hearted attempts were made at reform during the war and in its immediate aftermath, but with little effect. Two important Royal Commissions were established in 1902 – the Esher Committee and the Norfolk Commission – and reported in 1904. The Esher Report called for wide-ranging reforms in the administration of the Army and the War Office, whilst the Norfolk Commission, which had studied the auxiliary forces, declared them "unfit for service" and recommended various practical reforms alongside the much more sensational suggestion of universal military service. Some of these reforms were instituted under the Conservative Secretary of State for War, Hugh Arnold-Forster, in 1904–5, but the broad thrust of his reform plans were strongly opposed. Attempts to reorganise the home forces into six Army Corps had begun, but only one of these had actually been organised, and even that lacked many of its support units and staff.

== Haldane's reforms ==
The Balfour government collapsed in December 1905, and Sir Henry Campbell-Bannerman became Prime Minister, leading a minority Liberal government. Richard Haldane was appointed Secretary of State for War, an almost accidental selection – he himself had been aiming to be Lord Chancellor, whilst Campbell-Bannerman offered him the post of Attorney-General, then the Home Office, and had offered the War Office to two other men before Haldane offered to take it. Despite this inauspicious beginning, he would become, in the words of Douglas Haig, "the greatest Secretary of State for War England has ever had". Haldane took the post with well hidden preconceived ideas as to the role of the Army having realised that the reform-weary Generals in the War Office, after St John Brodrick, would not want another Secretary of State for War who was intent on changing things yet again. Haldane's success was that he got the Generals on side having gained their trust and respect, then expunged the War Office of those officers who did not support his reforms and with the support of Lord Esher, Maj.-Gen. Haig and Colonel Ellison, finally designed and implemented a set of reforms that would go some way to preparing the British Army for the opening salvos of the First World War.

=== Creation of an Expeditionary Force ===
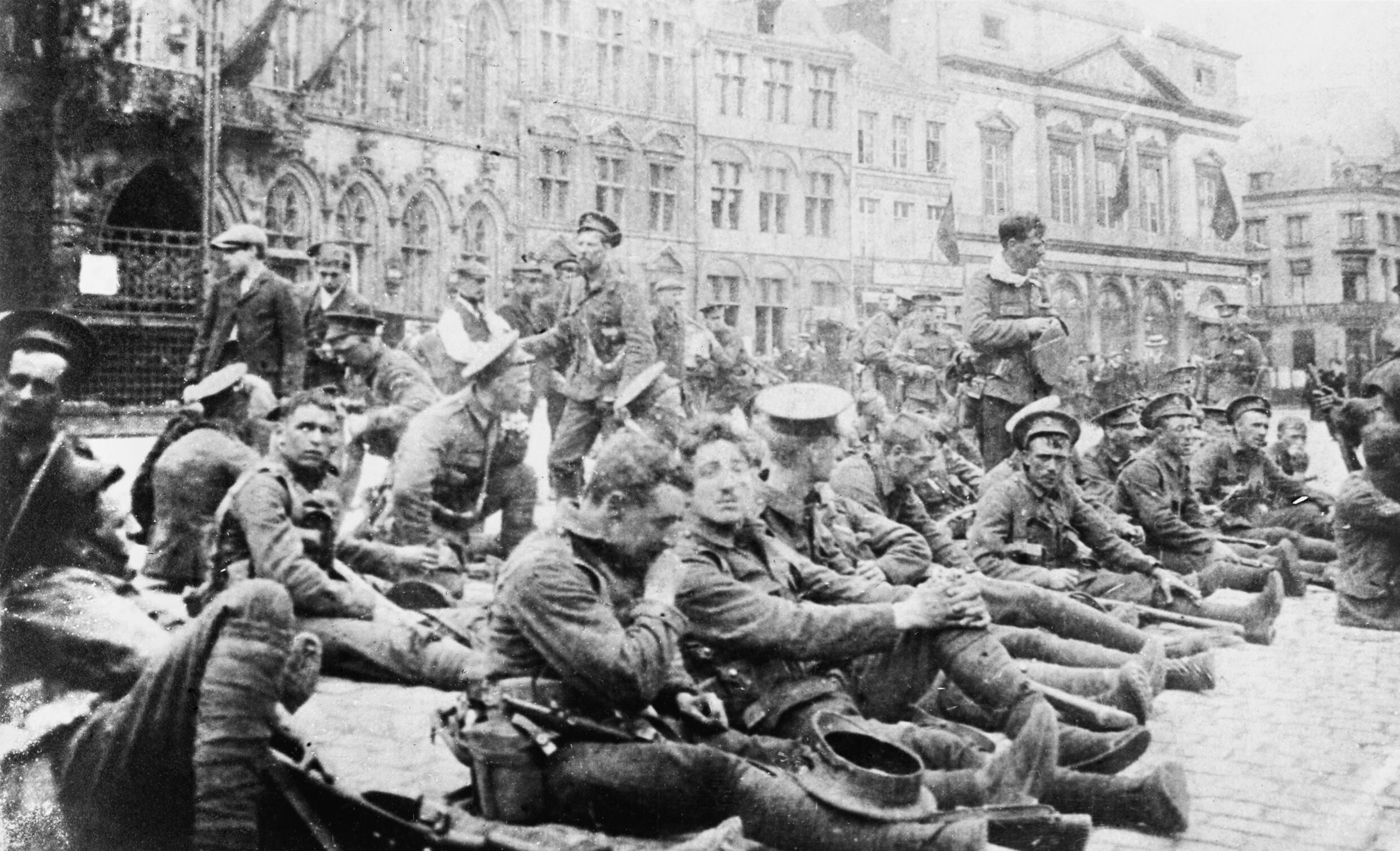
The Expeditionary Force on service: men of 4th/Royal Fusiliers resting before the Battle of Mons, 22 August 1914

After a brief hiatus during the 1906 general election, which the Liberals won by a landslide, obtaining a majority of 126 seats in the House of Commons, Haldane turned his attention to the Tangier Crisis, which had almost brought France and Germany to war in December. Sir Edward Grey, the Foreign Secretary, had privately agreed to commit the Army to the aid of France, if attacked, and Haldane began to consider how best to accomplish this. He quickly concluded that there was a need for a regular expeditionary force, specifically prepared and trained for use as a continental intervention force. The question now became how to provide this force, and after a short period Haldane settled on a strength of six infantry divisions and their supporting units. They would need to be organised in peacetime and prepared to mobilise in the United Kingdom, as they would be committed into action as soon as they reached the Continent.

As the Army was now geared to a specific purpose, it could be reorganised to fit this role; any elements which did not fit could be discarded to help pay for the changes; this was to include the disbandment of ten infantry battalions and a number of surplus artillery batteries, and the withdrawal of some overseas garrisons. The Army at home was reorganised into six divisions by a Special Army Order dated 1 January 1907, with one "heavy" four-brigade Cavalry Division and two mounted brigades for reconnaissance, along with some Army troops. In February 1907, Haldane announced the coming year's spending estimates; despite the creation of the new force, the disbanded units and other minor efficiencies had managed to reduce overall spending by two to three million pounds.

=== Creation of the Territorial Force ===
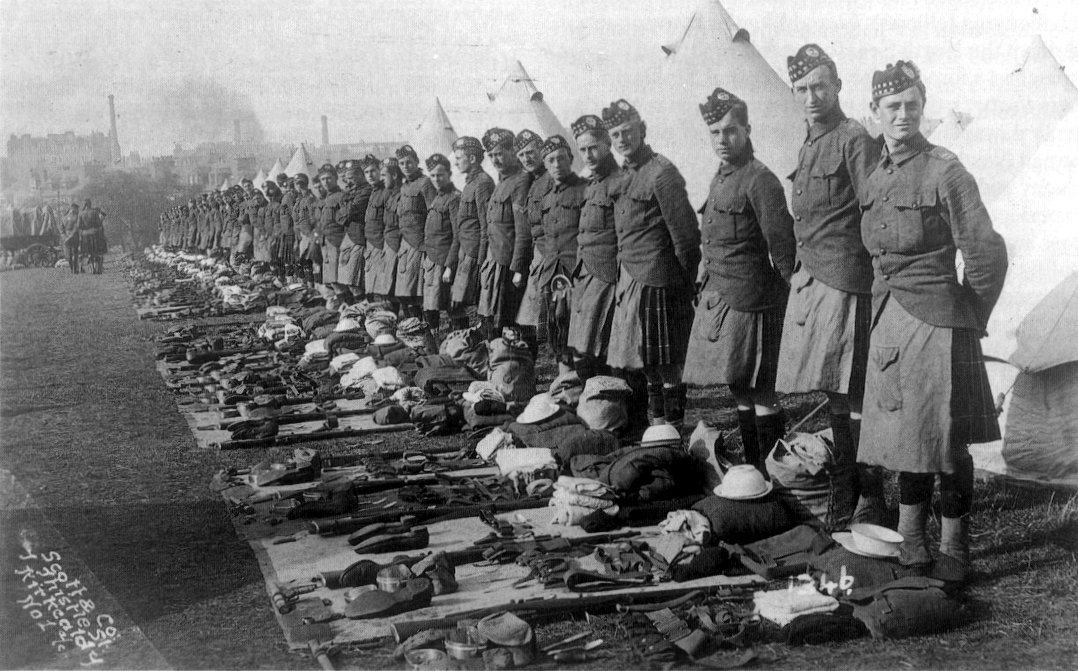
A company of the Liverpool Scottish, a Territorial unit, on parade after mobilisation in September 1914

Once the Regular Army had been organised as a continental Expeditionary Force, experience from the Second Boer War suggested that it would be necessary to reinforce it with a larger second line. Haldane had taken a great deal of trouble to win over Lord Esher, whose commission had recommended conscription for this purpose but he still faced a determined and influential campaign by the National Service League, led by Field Marshal Lord Roberts, to introduce conscription. This was supported by a combination of retired generals and some Conservative politicians and writers. In making his case that Territorials could not man 'all arms' brigades and divisions, Lord Roberts even persuaded King Edward that Territorials could never be competent in areas like artillery until Haldane managed to secure Esher's support in lobbying him. Haldane originally designed the Territorial force both for home defence and as a second line for the expeditionary force, saying in November 1906 '... at the end of …[six months' training], ...they would be ready, finding themselves in their units, to say 'we wish to go abroad and take our part in the theatre of war…' and describing the planned Territorial Force as 'the sole means of support and expansion of the professional army'. He repeated this view in similar words in his Army Estimates speech in February 1907.

Besides opposition from Lord Roberts and the conscription lobby, his proposals were also under fire from the other side of the political spectrum – more radical elements of his own party who raised concerns about building up a potentially large expeditionary force and Labour members worried about militarism. A third set of pressures came from within the various existing volunteer reserve organisations, resenting a loss of independence and, in the case of the militia, leading to outright opposition to the plans.

In delivering his Territorial and Reserve Forces Bill to Parliament, in March 1907, Haldane abruptly changed the nominal purpose of the Territorial Force to head off the opposition, legislating only for compulsory service for Home Defence. He watered down his original vision to saying that 'they could go abroad if they wish.' Under this proposal, the Volunteers and Yeomanry would be transformed into the Territorial Force administered by County Territorial Associations. Meanwhile, the Militia would be disbanded and its depots used for a new, all infantry Special Reserve, which would contain men who had not served in the regular Army but agreed to be liable for service with the regular forces in wartime.

The Territorial and Reserve Forces Act 1907, passed the Commons with little opposition save for a dispute over the future status of Militia regiments. The new Territorial Force was to consist of fourteen infantry divisions, fourteen cavalry brigades, and a large number of support units, all raised, organised and financed by local organisations but liable for service under War Office command. The design of the Territorial Force remained well beyond the obvious needs of home defence: fully established divisions, provided with field artillery, companies of engineers and crucial supply services, including medical provision.

=== Training and doctrine ===
In November 1906, Douglas Haig was appointed Director of Staff Duties at the War Office, and took up the task of providing a new training doctrine for the Army. The Esher Report had suggested a new scheme for two sets of training manuals, but these had not been fully implemented. In 1907, the new provisional "Field Service Pocket Book" was produced, revised the following year, and finally standardised as "Field Service Regulations, Part I – Operations" in 1909. This was to serve as the training manual for all branches of the service, and was the synthesis of the generally agreed tactical and strategic principles which had emerged from the South African War.

Part II, "Administration", however, was more contentious. Haig was strongly in favour of an entirely new system, where the manual would cover the whole organisation of a field army, including base and lines-of-communication troops as well as field units. This was strongly opposed by the Adjutant-General and Quartermaster-General staff, who felt that it was unnecessary, and resented such an imposition on their 'territory' by what they saw as an outsider. However, with Haldane's support, Haig was able to push this through and ensure its adoption.

=== Officer Training Corps ===
One issue that was foreseen as a potential problem was the supply of skilled officers to the Army in wartime and there was an immediate requirement to provide trained officers for the Territorial Force in peacetime. A committee was established in 1906 under Sir Edward Ward to study the matter. It issued two reports, one focusing on university and school corps, and one on the Special Reserve. The main recommendation of the former was to reorganise the existing school Cadet Corps and university Rifle Corps, which had been formed on an ad-hoc basis as part of the broader Volunteer movement, into a uniform force, administered and supported by the War Office.

Under Army Order 160 of 1908, contingents of the "Senior Division" were established in universities, and contingents of the "Junior Division" in public schools. Army Order 178, later the same year, provided a standard set of regulations, stating that the scheme was intended to provide "a standardized degree of elementary military training with a view to providing candidates for commissions".

The scheme was popular; by the end of 1910, there were 19 contingents of the "Senior Division" and 152 of the "Junior Division", and one year later, at the start of 1912, this had risen to 55 and 155 respectively. A total of 23,700 cadets were enrolled as of 1 January 1912, with 630 officers, and 830 former cadets had already gone on to take commissions in the auxiliary forces.

=== Imperial General Staff ===
In the later part of the nineteenth century, the emphasis of Imperial defence policy had shifted from a single centralised Army and Navy to an approach whereby the self-governing Dominions began to provide forces for their own defence, and to begin to take responsibility for strategic interests and bases in their own geographic areas. In all four of the then dominions, these consisted of a tiny professional core, embedded in much larger volunteer forces – this was to remain the case in peacetime up to the Second World War. The culmination of this was the South African War, where contingents from the Dominion militaries had played a significant role.

However, whilst the forces were developing locally, the goals of a comprehensive Imperial defence policy remained constant. A proposal was made to a conference of Dominion leaders in 1907, which recommended that all Imperial forces be organised along a standard model, similar to the recent divisional reorganisation of the British Army and the Army in India (the combined British Army units in India and the Indian Army units). The conference approved this concept, but carried the idea further, and recommended the creation of a general staff drawn from the forces of the entire Empire. This Imperial General Staff would serve as a common link between the national forces, and could oversee the development of a single uniform defence scheme. It would also be able to help ensure greater consistency between the forces, though it was carefully laid down that the Imperial General Staff could only offer "guidance" to the local government and General Staff, and would not have any binding authority over the national forces.

The new system was approved by an Imperial conference in July 1909, which confirmed the support for the new structure, and the principle of standardisation, as well as emphasising that it was not to limit "the autonomy of the self-governing Dominions".

== First World War ==
The outbreak of the First World War in August 1914 saw the bulk of the changes put to the sternest of tests; the Expeditionary Force of six divisions was quickly sent to the Continent, where, facing overwhelming odds, they secured the left flank of the French Army. Of the 90,000 members of the original BEF deployed in August, four-fifths were dead or wounded by Christmas. Meanwhile, a Territorial Force of 14 divisions and Reserves was mobilised as Haldane had envisaged to provide a second line. The mobilisation was carried out punctually and the divisions were armed. By April 1915, six complete Territorial divisions had deployed to France. According to BEF commander in chief, Field Marshal (then) Sir John French, "Without the assistance which the Territorials afforded between October 1914 and June 1915, it would have been impossible to hold the line in France and Belgium."

Douglas Haig, French's successor described Haldane as 'The greatest Secretary of State for War England has ever had.' Haldane's remarkable work was, however heavily based on the foundations which Viscount Cardwell and his principal military adviser Garnet Wolseley had laid down.

== Bibliography ==
- Dunlop, John K. (1938). The development of the British Army 1899–1914. London: Methuen.
- Ensor, (Sir) Robert (1936). England: 1870–1914. (The Oxford History of England, Volume XIV) (revised, 1980 ed.). Oxford: Oxford University Press. ISBN 0-19-821705-6.
- Higgens, Simon (2011). How was Richard Haldane able to reform the British Army? An historical assessment using a contemporary change management model (PDF). M.Phil thesis, University of Birmingham.
- Morris, A.J. Anthony. "Haldane's army reforms 1906–8: the deception of the radicals." History 56.186 (1971): 17–34. online
- Sheppard, Eric (1950). A short history of the British Army (4th ed.). London: Constable.
- Spiers, E.M. Haldane: an Army Reformer (Edinburgh University Press, 1980)
- Campbell, John (2020). Haldane, The forgotten Statesman who shaped Modern Britain. London: C Hurst and Co.
- Simkins, Peter (1988). Kitchener's Army, the raising of the New Armies 1914–16. Manchester: Manchester University Press.
- Dennis, Peter (1987). The Territorial Army 1906–1940. Woodbridge, Suffolk: The Royal Historical Society: Boydell Press.
- Perry, F. W. (1988). The Commonwealth Armies, Manpower and organisation in two world wars. Manchester: Manchester University Press.
