= County territorial association =

Administrative unit of the British army

A county territorial association was a body created to administer units of the Territorial Force located within an area largely defined by existing county boundaries of the United Kingdom. Ninety-four associations were established when the Territorial Force was created on 1 April 1908, later rising to 104.

== Constitution ==
Each association was led by a lord lieutenant acting as president, along with a chairman and a vice-chairmen. The association membership comprised officers from each of the territorial units administered by the association, representatives of civic institutions, and leaders of business and worker interests. The democratic constitution of the associations was a deliberate effort by the architect of the Territorial Force, Richard Haldane, to bring military and society closer together and create a nation that could be mobilised for war without resorting to conscription. In this, Haldane was only partially successful. Opposition from the commanders of the Volunteer Force and Yeomanry, the two auxiliary institutions that were consolidated to form the Territorial Force, forced Haldane to compromise on his plans for strong civilian representation. Instead of being elected, civic leaders were to be appointed by the Army Council, which also controlled the appointment of the association leadership and military members. Business and worker interests were represented by members co-opted by the association, but the civilian members were not allowed to outnumber Territorial Force members. In practice, many co-opted members had military backgrounds, while strong representation of workers' interests proved difficult in the face of fundamental opposition to the Territorial Force by trade unions. Associations varied in size according to the number of territorial units administered; the smallest had less than 20 members, the largest 75.

To address the military deficiencies of the previous volunteer auxiliaries, the War Office was responsible for the finance, training and command of the Territorial Force, while the associations were responsible for its recruitment, equipping and administration. The actual work of an association was completed by sub-committees which usually met quarterly. Most decisions were taken by a General Purposes Committee, based on the recommendations of committees which oversaw finance, buildings and ranges, clothing and equipment, and transport. Their work was under-pinned by the association's secretary, a salaried employee recognised by both the associations and the War Office to be the key to the success of the territorial concept. The position was subject to the approval of the Army Council, and very few secretaries were without military rank. Those associations which chose to advertise for the position rather than simply nominate often received large numbers of applications.

== Finance ==
The salary to be paid to secretaries was a source of friction that became a constant theme in relations between associations and a parsimonious War Office. Finance was made available from army funds under four headings:

- Administration, which included running costs of facilities cleaning and maintenance of arms, band, prizes, and the association's own expenses;
- Rent of facilities;
- Clothing, personal equipment and horse tack;
- Travel costs.

Grants for administration and clothing was based on the number of men in the units administered, at an allocation of £1 (equivalent to £129 in 2023) and £1 3s (equivalent to £148 in 2023) per man respectively. Rent was allocated as required and travel expenses were derived from a complicated system of allowances. As one of the largest associations, West Lancashire spent £62,000 (equivalent to £7,967,000 in 2023) in its first year and, due to the maintenance and construction of drill halls, double that amount the year after.

== Facilities ==
Associations took over the facilities of the former auxiliary institutions, though many were in a poor state of repair or in the wrong locations for the newly formed territorial units. Much of the initial work of the associations was involved in completing surveys of the facilities they were to administer, sorting through myriad and often complex legal ownership and tenancy agreements, and deciding on which buildings were to be used, improved, built or released. In this, too, there was friction between the War Office and the associations. The County of London, for example, was denied £1,000 of the £5,000 it needed to build a new headquarters for one of its artillery batteries, and Kent was permitted only £1,500 of the £5,096 it needed to repair and adapt its facilities. The War Office restricted the cost of structural repairs to one per cent of the value of a building, but in response to numerous complaints from the associations about the inadequacy of this figure, it began to make grants available for major alterations. It nevertheless rejected increasing numbers of applications as too expensive, and angered the associations further with its bureaucracy. In 1909, the Gloucestershire association complained that "most of our association are businessmen and are unable to understand why it takes ten weeks and upwards to reply" when it submitted a proposal for the purchase of a site for its field ambulance unit, then had to wait a further eight weeks for a response. To add insult to injury, the War Office refused to reimburse the additional costs incurred by its procrastination. The Somerset association lost three sites for a proposed new drill hall because the War Office took so long to approve plans.

== Training ==
Although training was the responsibility of the War Office, there was some confusion over whether this included weekend camps. Associations were responsible for travel costs and the provision of horses, and the expense incurred meant that many would refuse to sanction such camps for their units. The mandatory annual camp was a source of friction between the associations and the officers commanding the territorial divisions, and demonstrated the gulf in priorities between the two. For the associations, camp was a significant showcase and a major attraction for recruitment, more so than financial incentives. They were anxious that camps should run smoothly, and regarded coastal venues as a key benefit. Dates were planned well in advance, based on employers' needs and the requirement to arrange the hire of horses in a competitive market. Divisional commanders would often complicate the associations' work by suggesting different dates or even rescheduling previously agreed dates. It wasn't until 1912 that the military authorities began to appreciate the difficulties in scheduling that the associations faced. The same year, the Army Council ruled that coastal venues would only be allowed to a unit once every three years, based on commanders' concerns that camps were being treated more as a holiday than a training exercise.

== Transport ==
Associations were responsible for the provision of horses and vehicles for weekly drills, camp and mobilisation. Infantry units had minimal need for such transport, and yeomanry units generally supplied their own, but demand from the artillery, engineer and ambulance units could be considerable. The methods adopted varied; some associations hired horses, others bought them. Rather than keep horses idle, many associations that purchased them entered into bailments, in which third parties were allowed to make use of the horses when not required for territorial duties in return for their care and upkeep. Some also attempted to recoup part of the purchase costs by hiring out horses for private or trade use. From 1910, associations were able to take advantage of interest-free loans made available by the War Office to increase the proportion of owned stock. The finances made available for transport was criticised by the associations as inadequate. In particular, no provision was made for the training of drivers in infantry battalions until 1910 when, after pressure from the associations, the War Office made funds available for this purpose.

The government had no clear idea of the quantity of horses that could be pressed into service in any given area, and no system for the collection of animals should the army be mobilised. To address this, the War Office attempted in 1910 to implement what it regarded as an efficient, centralised system and devolved the responsibility for operating it to local institutions. The police were tasked with an annual census of horses in each county, while the associations were to maintain the register thus obtained and be responsible for collecting the horses on mobilisation, both for their own needs and those of the regular army. The associations, who were not consulted, were outraged by the imposition of additional work of such vital national importance, for which they had no legal authority and would not be remunerated. It did not help that the army would be prioritised in the allocation of horses, and that a general lack of sufficient numbers would leave the Territorial Force effectively immobile. Some associations made efforts to comply with the scheme, but the War Office was forced to relent in the face of widespread protest, and in 1911 it implemented a revised scheme in which remount officers of the regular army undertook the bulk of the work.

== See also ==
Territorial, Auxiliary and Volunteer Reserve Association

== Bibliography ==
- Beckett, Ian Frederick William (2008). Territorials: A Century of Service. Plymouth: DRA Publishing. ISBN 9780955781315.
- Beckett, Ian Frederick William (2011). Britain's Part-Time Soldiers: The Amateur Military Tradition: 1558–1945. Barnsley, South Yorkshire: Pen & Sword Military. ISBN 9781848843950.
- Mitchinson, K. W. (2008). England's Last Hope: The Territorial Force, 1908–1914. London: Palgrave Macmillan. ISBN 9780230574540.
