= National Service League =

British pressure group

The National Service League (NSL) was a British pressure group founded in February 1902 to campaign for the introduction of compulsory military training in Great Britain, in order to protect the country against invasion, particularly from Germany.

The League advocated the introduction of four years of compulsory military training for men aged between eighteen and thirty, for the purpose of home defence. Britain was one of the few western states not to have a mass conscript army, and compulsory military service was not a popular idea in the country. For many, the idea "aroused the long-standing antipathy toward standing armies and smacked of continental-style militarism". To reflect public opinion, the League's proposal was for a part-time force for home defence only, with conscripts undergoing two months' training under canvas, followed by three annual training camps.

The League was founded on 26 February 1902 at the instigation of Conservative politician Lord Newton, with the fourth Duke of Wellington as its first president. Initially the League was one pressure group among many, and made little impression. By October 1904, it had only 1,725 members with 2,000 in 1905. However, in November 1905 Field Marshal Lord Roberts agreed to become the League's president, becoming its figurehead and leading spokesman. This helped transform the League into a significant force in British public life. It accordingly grew in size, with a membership of 21,500 in December 1908, with a further 30,000 'adherents'. The circulation of the League's journal, The Nation in Arms, grew to 17,500. By 1910 the League had 60,000 members. The League's Annual Reports of 1908 and 1913 commented that the number of local branches in the country were 33 and 45 respectively. The Annual Report of 1913 stated that the 'total of subscribers', which included members and associates, was 96,526 and the 'number of adherents' was 163,746. Well known members included Field Marshal Lord Wolseley and Rudyard Kipling.

Fear of a possible German invasion of Britain, coupled with the belief that only the Army and not the Navy could stop an invasion underlaid many of the League's proposals, and were emphasised by Lord Roberts in a series of speeches that received extensive coverage. At a broader level, conscription of the kind envisaged was seen as a way to encourage national regeneration and counter moral decadence and physical deterioration.

While the League tried to appeal to those of all and no political allegiances, in practice most of its support came from Conservative supporters, including peers and MPs, although compulsory military service was never Conservative policy. While Churchill and Lloyd George (both Liberal Cabinet Ministers) sometimes expressed private support for conscription, the official view of ministers was that compulsory training was not neither militarily necessary nor acceptable to the electorate.

The League did not finally succeed in persuading Parliament of the need for conscription, and its campaign was suspended at the outbreak of the First World War. Its pre-war campaign did however help contribute to the climate of opinion that finally accepted conscription in 1916. The League was formally wound up in March 1921, with its remaining funds, about £10,000, donated to the Boy Scouts Association.

== See also ==
- Timeline of young people's rights in the United Kingdom
