= 6th Battalion, Royal Scots =

3rd Edinburgh Rifle Volunteers 4th Volunteer Battalion, Royal Scots 6th Battalion, Royal Scots 226 (City of Edinburgh) Medium Battery
- Active: 1867–1921
- Country: United Kingdom
- Branch: Territorial Force
- Role: Infantry; Medium/Heavy artillery
- Size: Battalion; Battery
- Part of: Lothian Brigade
- Garrison/HQ: Gilmore Place drill hall, Edinburgh
- Nickname: John Hope's Water Rats
- Engagements: Second Boer War; Senussi Campaign; Western Front

Commanders
- Notable commanders: Lt-Col John Hope; Col George McCrae

The 6th Battalion, Royal Scots, was a unit of Britain's part-time Territorial Force. Beginning as a Volunteer unit formed from teetotallers in the city of Edinburgh in 1867, it later became affiliated to the Royal Scots. During World War I it served in the Senussi Campaign and on the Western Front. Postwar it was converted into a medium artillery battery.

== Volunteer Force ==
The enthusiasm for the Volunteer movement following an invasion scare in 1859 saw the creation of many Rifle Volunteer Corps (RVCs) composed of part-time soldiers eager to supplement the Regular British Army in time of need. The 1st City of Edinburgh RVC comprised 21 different companies raised in that city between August 1859 and November 1860 drawn from miscellaneous interests. No 16 Company was formed on 29 February 1860 by John Hope entirely from members of the British Temperance League who had 'signed the pledge' as Total abstainers. Hope then decided to raise a complete corps of abstainers from Edinburgh and on 27 May 1867 the 3rd City of Edinburgh RVC of two companies was formed with Hope in command. Most of his recruits (and the cap badge) were taken from No 16 Company, and the 3rd RVC remained administratively attached to the 1st City of Edinburgh RVC (the Queen's Edinburgh Volunteer Rifle Brigade) for several years. The unit, known locally as 'John Hope's Water Rats', added new companies in 1868,1872 and 1877, reaching a total of six companies. In 1880 it was renumbered as the 2nd Edinburgh RVC. From 1861 to 1892 the British Temperance League Cadet Corps of four companies with John Hope in command was affiliated to the unit.

== Localisation ==
Under the 'Localisation of Forces' scheme introduced in 1872 by the Cardwell Reforms, the unit was grouped with the 1st Regiment of Foot (the Royal Scots), the Edinburgh Light Infantry Militia, the QERVB and a number of other RVCs from neighbouring counties into Brigade No 62. When these were combined into a single regiment under the Childers Reforms of 1881, the 2nd Edinburgh RVC became a Volunteer Battalion (VB) of the Royal Scots, being numbered 4th VB in 1888. Two additional companies were added in 1900: G Company at Portobello, Edinburgh, and H Company at the Church of Scotland Teacher Training College.

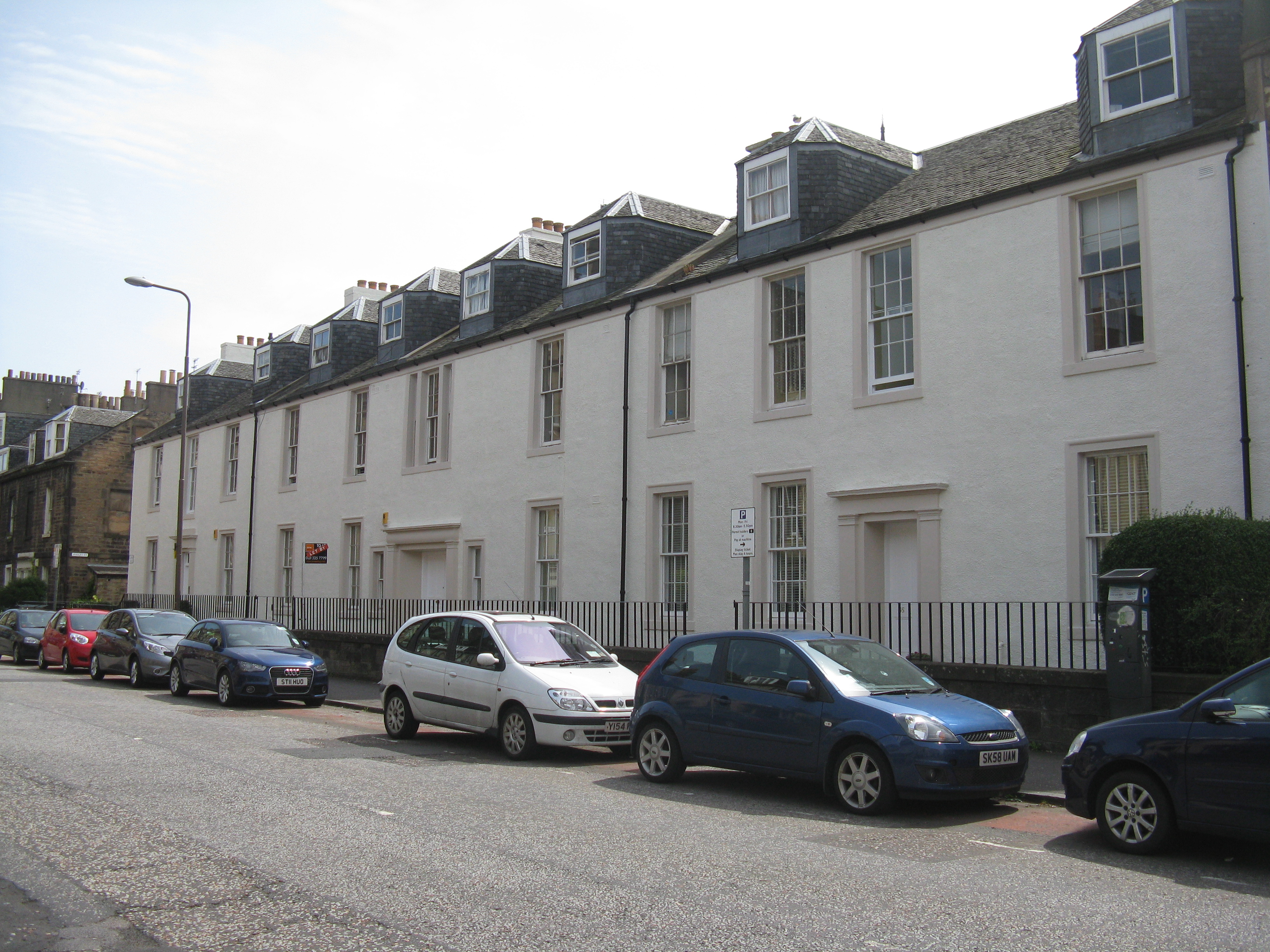
The frontage of the Gilmore Place drill hall today.

The Stanhope Memorandum of December 1888 introduced a Mobilisation Scheme for Volunteer units, which would assemble in their own brigades at key points in case of war. In peacetime these brigades provided a structure for collective training. Under this scheme the 4th VB was included in the Forth Brigade based at 51 Hanover Street, Edinburgh, later at Surgeons' Hall. In 1902 the Forth Brigade was split into the 1st and 2nd Lothian Brigades, with the 4th VB in the 1st Brigade. It also belonged to the 32nd Brigade of the field army and trained with it for a fortnight each year. The unit's headquarters (HQ) was at Gilmore Place drill hall, Edinburgh, and in common with other Edinburgh Volunteer units it used a rifle range at Hunters Bog in Holyrood Park

== Second Boer War ==
Sixty-four volunteers from 4th VB served in Volunteer Service Companies of the Royal Scots and the Scottish Volunteer Cyclist Company in the Second Boer War, earning ihe battalion its first Battle honour: South Africa 1900–02.

From 1905, the commanding officer (CO) was Lt-Col George McCrae, VD, who in 1914 raised the 16th Bn Royal Scots ('McCrae's Battalion'), a Kitchener's Army unit containing a number of players from Heart of Midlothian F.C.

== Territorial Force ==
When the Volunteers were subsumed into the new Territorial Force (TF) under the Haldane Reforms of 1908, the 4th VB became the 6th Battalion, Royal Scots, with its HQ remaining at Gilmore Place.

The battalion remained attached to the Lothian Bde, which did not join any of the TF's new infantry divisions but continued independently in its coast defence role.

== World War I ==
=== Mobilisation ===
On the outbreak of war on 4 August 1914, the Lothian Brigade mobilised at Edinburgh as part of Scottish Coastal Defences.

Almost immediately, TF units were invited to volunteer for Overseas Service. On 15 August 1914, the War Office issued instructions to separate those men who had signed up for Home Service only, and form these into reserve units. On 31 August, the formation of a reserve or 2nd Line unit was authorised for each 1st Line unit where 60 per cent or more of the men had volunteered for Overseas Service. The titles of these 2nd Line units would be the same as the original, but distinguished by a '2/' prefix, and a 2nd Lothian Brigade was formed from these units. 3rd Line training units were formed in 1915. The only TF battalion of the Royal Scots that did not immediately form a 2nd line was the 6th Bn, which instead provided two companies of reinforcements to bring 1/4th and 1/8th Bns Royal Scots up to war establishment. A 2/6th Battalion was finally formed in March 1915.

=== 1/6th Royal Scots ===
Having contributed large drafts to other battalions, 1/6th Battalion did not leave the Lothian Brigade until 5 September 1915 when it embarked at Devonport to go to Egypt to join the Western Frontier Force (WFF) on 20 November. After serving with the WFF in the Senussi Campaign it was sent to France on 27 February 1916 for Line of communication duties on the Western Front. 1/6th Battalion arrived at Marseilles on 15 May 1916 and was immediately amalgamated with 1/5th Bn Royal Scots.

=== 5th/6th Royal Scots ===
See main article 5th/6th Royal Scots

On 29 July the combined 5th/6th Bn joined 14th Bde in 32nd Division. The 32nd was a Kitchener's Army formation that had been bolstered by the Regular 14th Bde. It had suffered heavy casualties on the First day of the Somme (1 July) and 5th/6th Royal Scots replaced one of its shattered battalions.

On 18 November, 14th Bde took part in the Battle of the Ancre Heights the last action of the Somme offensive. It then took part in minor operations along the Ancre in January and February 1917, and then followed the German retreat to the Hindenburg Line (Operation Alberich) in March and April. The division then moved to the Flanders coast to support an expected breakthrough at Ypres that never came.

In April 1918, 32nd Division was sent as reinforcements to help stop the German spring offensive (Operation Michael). 32nd Division was in reserve when the Allied Hundred Days Offensive began on 8 August at the Battle of Amiens, though 5th/6th RS was briefly engaged. The battalion then led the division's attack on 11 August. During the Battle of the Scarpe (28 August) 5th/6th RS's advance was described as 'a procession', and soon after dawn the next day they had pushed right up to the river. On 5 September one company of the battalion waded across at the site of Brie bridge and cleared the far bank.

Facing the most formidable part of the Hindenburg Line on the St Quentin Canal, 5th/6th RS went into action on 1 October against the village of Sequehart. The village changed hands four times until on 3 October the battalion, which had specifically asked for another chance to take the village, succeeded in holding it.

When the Battle of the Sambre opened on 4 November, two platoons of 5th/6th RS were given the task of attacking le Donjon two minutes after Zero Hour behind a special barrage. By 13.30 the whole battalion had crossed the river.

After the Armistice with Germany, 32nd Division was chosen as part of the occupation force (the British Army of the Rhine). On 3 February 1919 the division took over the southern sector of the Cologne bridgehead. In March 5/6 Royal Scots joined 2nd Lowland Brigade in the Lowland Division (formed from 9th (Scottish) Division. The division was disbanded in October, and 5th/6th Royal Scots was demobilised on 12 November 1919.

=== 2/6th Royal Scots ===
The 2/6th Battalion was finally formed at Edinburgh in March 1915. It moved to Peebles in May, and in November was attached to 195th Bde in 65th (2nd Lowland) Division at Cambuslang. That month the infantry battalions in the 64th (2nd Highland) and 65th (2nd Lowland) Divisions were reorganised and numbered sequentially, the 2/4th, 2/5th and 2/6th Royal Scots temporarily combining as No 19 Battalion; by May 1916 they had reverted to their previous regimental designations, but 2/6th remained merged with 2/4th.

=== 3/6th Royal Scots ===
The 3/6th Battalion was formed in May 1915 as a training unit. In April 1916 it was redesignated 6th Reserve Bn, Royal Scots, but in September it was merged into the 4th Reserve Bn at Catterick Garrison.

=== 6th Scottish Provisional Battalion ===
In 1915 the Home Service men of the 4th, 5th and 6th Royal Scots were combined into 6th Scottish Provisional Battalion, which joined the Lothian Brigade (redesignated the Scottish Provisional Brigade and later 1st Provisional Brigade) on 22 May. In April 1916 the 1st Provisional Bde moved from Scotland to Kent to take over coastal defence duties. The Military Service Act 1916 swept away the Home/Foreign service distinction, and all TF soldiers became liable for overseas service, if medically fit, and the remaining provisional battalions were reorganised, but the 6th Provisional Bn had already been disbanded and its men dispersed.

== Disbandment ==
See main article 51st (Lowland) Heavy Regiment, Royal Artillery

Although the TF battalions of the Royal Scots were all reformed in 1920, several of them were amalgamated or converted to other roles when the TF was reorganised as the Territorial Army (TA) in 1921. The 6th and 8th Bns Royal Scots each provided batteries to 57th (Lowland) Medium Brigade, Royal Garrison Artillery:

- HQ at 6 Wemyss Place, Edinburgh
- 225 (City of Edinburgh) Medium Bty at Drill Hall, 124 McDonald Road, Edinburgh – from Lowland Hy Bty, RGA
- 226 (City of Edinburgh) Medium Bty (Howitzers) at Drill Hall, Dalmeny Street, Leith – from 6th Bn Royal Scots
- 227 (Haddingtonshire) Medium Bty (Howitzers) at Drill Hall, Dalmeny Street, Leith – from 8th Bn Royal Scots
- 228 (Peeblesshire and Midlothian) Medium Bty (Howitzers) at High Street, Dunbar – from 8th Bn Royal Scots

(The Dalmeny Street Drill Hall had previously belonged to the 7th (Leith) Battalion, Royal Scots.)

Shortly before the outbreak of World War II the TA was doubled in size and 57th (Lowland) split into two medium regiments, 226 (City of Edinburgh) Bty remaining with the 57th, which was soon afterwards converted into 51st (Lowland) Heavy Regiment, Royal Artillery. This regiment served in the Battle of France and the campaign in North West Europe, and then as 357th (Lowland) Field Regiment, Royal Artillery, in the postwar TA until it disappeared in a succession of amalgamations during 1956–61.

== Uniforms and insignia ==
The uniform of the original 3rd Edinburgh RVC was scarlet tunics with blue facings, blue trousers with a broad scarlet stripe, and blue shakoes with a red-and-white ball tuft, later replaced by a scarlet upright horsehair plume. The British League Cadet Corps wore red Garibaldi shirts, blue forage caps and knickerbockers, and brown canvas leggings. In 1882 the renumbered 2nd Edinburgh RVC adopted blue helmets in place of shakoes. After it became the 4th VB Royal Scots, the unit adopted the uniform of that regiment, wearing tartan trews in place of trousers. The helmet was replaced with a Glengarry bonnet in 1904.

== Honorary Colonels ==
The following served as Honorary Colonel of the unit:

- John Hope, founding CO, appointed 27 June 1883
- William U. Martin, VD, former CO, appointed 4 April 1900
- Herbert Kitchener, 1st Earl Kitchener, appointed 19 August 1905

== Victoria Cross ==
Lieutenant David Stuart McGregor of the 6th Bn won a posthumous Victoria Cross at Hoogemolen on 22 October 1918 while attached to the Machine Gun Corps.

== Memorials ==
All Royal Scots who died in World War I are commemorated by the memorial gates unveiled at the regimental depot, Glencorse Barracks, Penicuik, in 1927.

The 6th Bn's colours carried between 1909 and 1920 are preserved in St. Giles's Cathedral, Edinburgh.

David McGregor's Victoria Cross is displayed at the Royal Scots Museum, Edinburgh Castle, Scotland.
