= John Kirk (VC) =

English soldier

- Born: July 1827; Liverpool, England
- Died: 31 August 1865 (aged 38); Liverpool, England
- Burial place: Anfield Cemetery
- Military career
- Allegiance: United Kingdom
- Branch: British Army
- Rank: Private
- Units: 10th Regiment of Foot
- Conflicts: Second Anglo-Sikh War; Indian Mutiny
- Awards: Victoria Cross

John Kirk VC (July 1827 – 31 August 1865) was an English soldier in the British Army who served in the Second Anglo-Sikh War and the Indian Mutiny. He is notable as a recipient of the Victoria Cross, the highest and most prestigious award for gallantry in the face of the enemy that can be awarded to British and Commonwealth forces.

== Details ==
Kirk was approximately 29 years old, and a private in the 10th Regiment of Foot (later The Lincolnshire Regiment), British Army during the Indian Mutiny when the following deed on 4 June 1857 at Benares, India led to the award of the Victoria Cross to him, Peter Gill and Matthew Rosamund:

For daring gallantry at Benares, on the 4th of June, 1857, on the outbreak of the mutiny of the Native Troops at that station, in having volunteered to proceed with two Non-commissioned Officers to rescue Captain Brown, Pension Paymaster, and his family, who were surrounded by rebels in the compound of their house; and having, at the risk of his own life, succeeded in saving them.

John Kirk died of tuberculosis on 31 August 1865. He is buried in Anfield Cemetery, Liverpool.

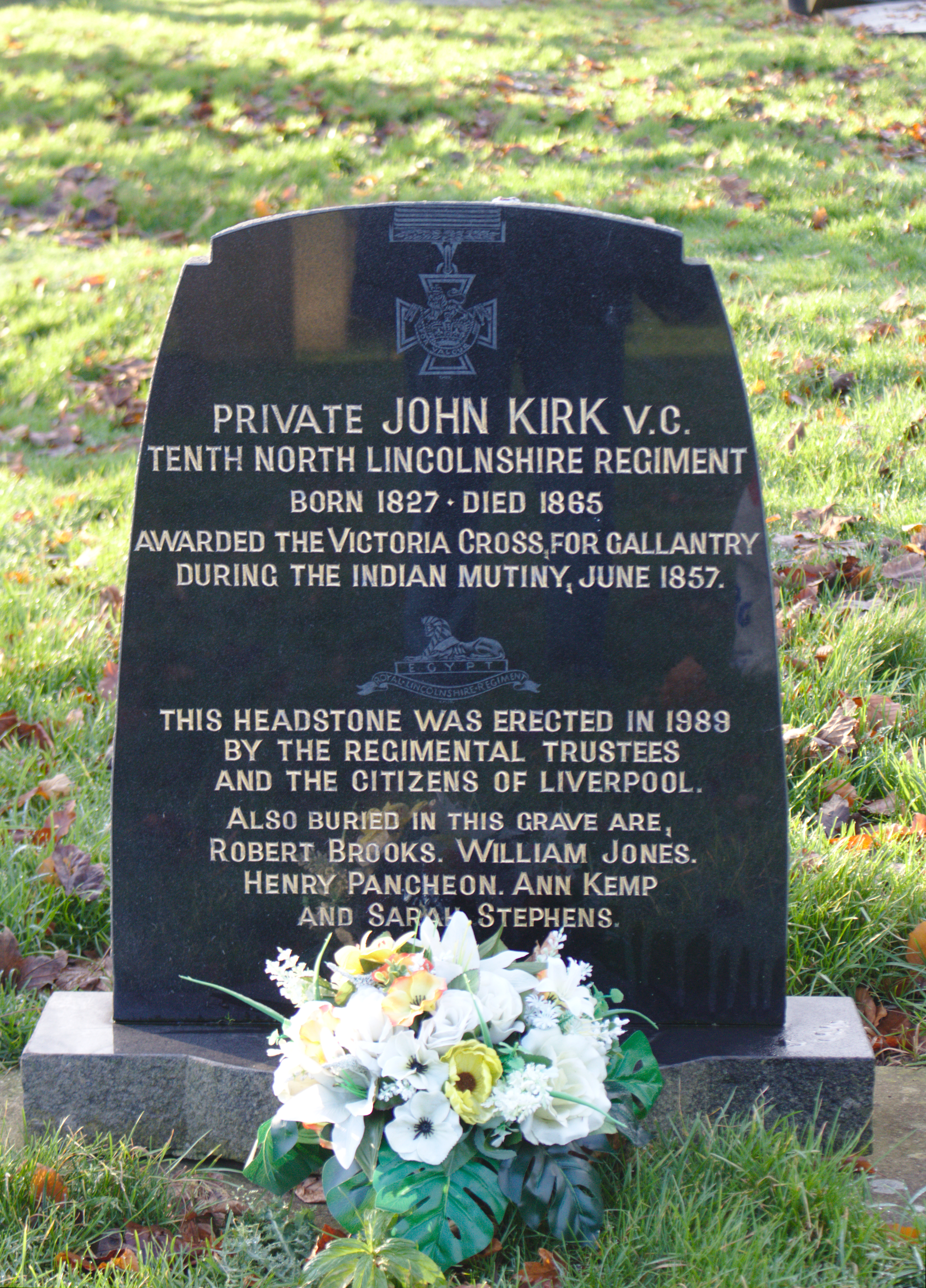
Gravestone in Anfield Cemetery

== The Medal ==
His Victoria Cross is displayed at the Museum of Lincolnshire Life, in Lincoln, England.

== See also ==
- Peter Gill
- Matthew Rosamund
