= David Stuart McGregor =

Scottish Victoria Cross recipient (1895-1918)

- Born: 16 October 1895; Edinburgh, Scotland
- Died: 22 October 1918 (aged 23); Hoogemolen, Belgium
- Burial place: Stasegem Communal Cemetery
- Military career
- Allegiance: United Kingdom
- Branch: British Army
- Rank: Lieutenant
- Units: The Royal Scots; Machine Gun Corps
- Conflicts: First World War †
- Awards: Victoria Cross

David Stuart McGregor VC (16 October 1895 – 22 October 1918) was a Scottish recipient of the Victoria Cross, the highest and most prestigious award for gallantry in the face of the enemy that can be awarded to British and Commonwealth forces. A soldier with The Royal Scots during the First World War, he was posthumously awarded the VC for his actions on 22 October 1918, during the Hundred Days Offensive.

== Early life ==
David Stuart McGregor was born on 16 October 1895 in Corstorphine, to the west of Edinburgh. His father, also named David, was in the clothing trade. Educated at George Watson's College and then George Heriot's School, in 1911 he began working at the Commercial Bank of Scotland. Two years later he joined the Territorial Force, serving in the Midlothian Royal Field Artillery.

== First World War ==
Following the outbreak of the First World War in the summer of 1914, McGregor enlisted, as did so many other young British men of his generation, in the British Army. He was commissioned into the 6th Battalion, Royal Scots, a Territorial Force (TF) unit. He was initially sent to Egypt with his battalion but by 1916 was serving on the Western Front. After receiving specialist training, he was posted to the Machine Gun Corps (MGC).

On 22 October 1918, during the Hundred Days Offensive, McGregor, attached to the MGC's 29th Battalion, 29th Division, was commanding a section of machine guns in support of a battalion advancing near Hoogemolen, in Belgium. However, the battalion came under heavy machine gun fire from a nearby hill which stopped further movement forward. Despite being under fire, McGregor was instrumental in getting the advance restarted by bringing forward his guns and directing their fire onto the Germans until he was killed. For his actions on 22 October he was posthumously awarded the Victoria Cross (VC). The VC, instituted in 1856, was the highest award for valour that could be bestowed on a soldier of the British Empire. The citation for McGregor's VC read:

"For most conspicuous bravery and devotion to duty near Hoogemolen on 22nd of October, 1918, when in command of a section of machineguns attached to the right flank platoon of the attacking battalion. Immediately the troops advanced they were subjected to intense enfilade machinegun fire from Hill 66 on the right flank. Lt. McGregor fearlessly went forward and located the enemy guns, and realised it was impossible to get his guns carried forward either by pack or by hand without great delay, as the ground was absolutely bare and fire-swept. Ordering his men to follow by a more covered route, he mounted the limber and galloped forward under intense fire for about 600 yards to cover. The driver, horses, and limber were all hit but Lt. McGregor succeeded in getting the guns into action, effectively engaging the enemy, and enabling the advance to be resumed. With the utmost gallantry he continued to expose himself in order to direct and control the fire of his guns until, about an hour later, he was killed. His great gallantry and supreme devotion to duty were the admiration of all ranks."

— The London Gazette, 13 December 1918

McGregor's body was recovered and he is buried in the Stasegem Communal Cemetery in West Flanders, four kilometres to the east of Kortrijk. A memorial stone and plaque on the boundary of George Heriot's School, at the junction of Lauriston Place and Heriot Place, was unveiled on the 100th anniversary of his death, 22 October 2018.

== Victoria Cross ==
King George V presented McGregor's VC to his parents on 15 February 1919, in a ceremony at Buckingham Palace. In 1976, his VC was donated to the Royal Scots and is displayed at the Royal Scots Museum in Edinburgh Castle, Scotland.
