= Gilmore Place drill hall =

Drill hall in Edinburgh, Scotland

- Edinburgh, Scotland
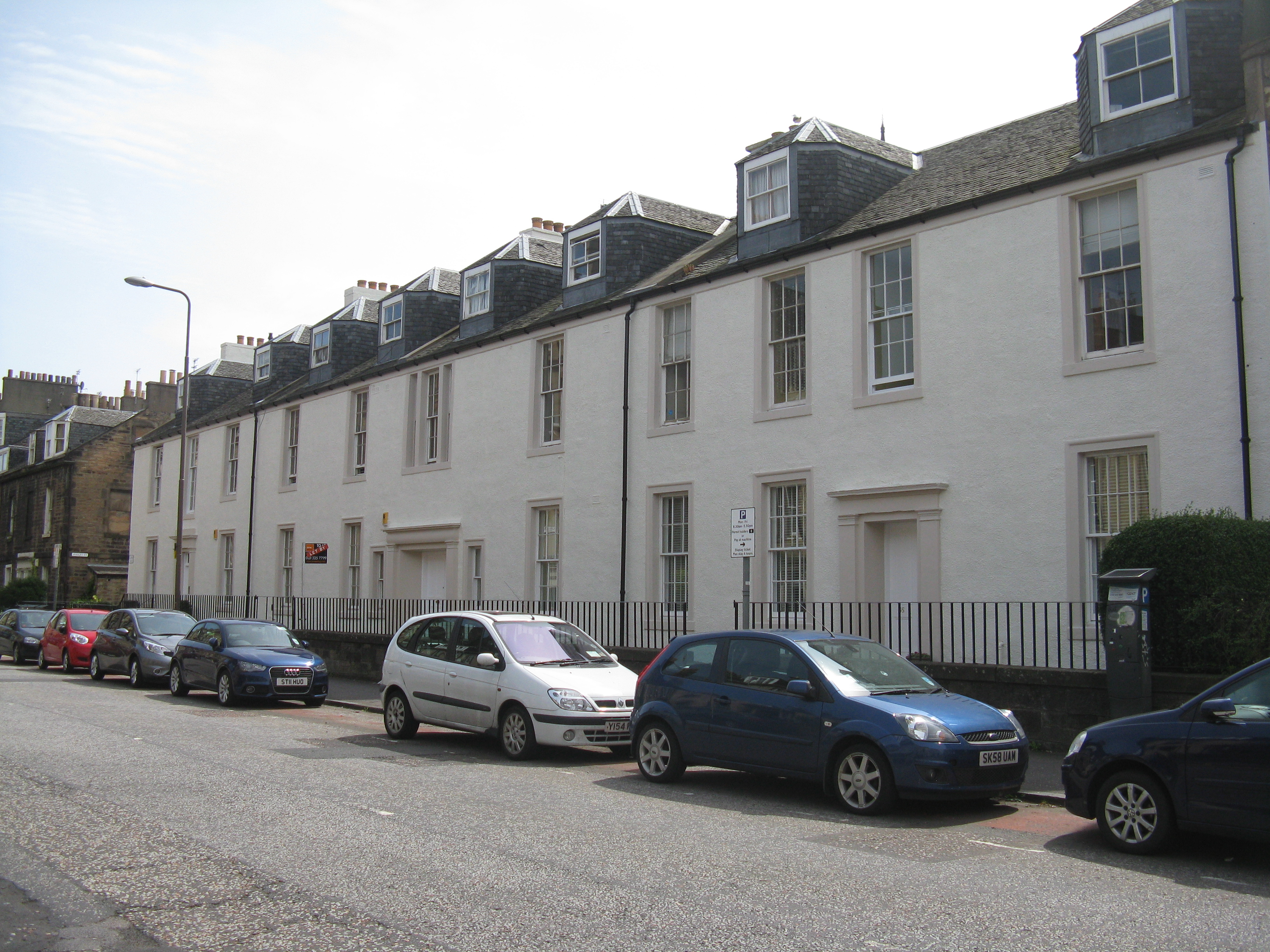
- The frontage of the Gilmore Place drill hall

Site information
- Type: Drill hall

Location
- Location in Edinburgh
- Coordinates: 55.94146°N 3.20562°W

Site history
- Built: 1907
- Built for: War Office
- In use: 1907 – late 1990s

The Gilmore Place drill hall was a military installation in Edinburgh.

== History ==
The drill hall was designed as the headquarters of the 4th Volunteer Battalion of the Royal Scots by connecting several 19th-century houses and adding a hall behind them in around 1907. This unit became the 6th Battalion, Royal Scots, in 1908. The battalion was mobilised at the drill hall in August 1914 before being deployed to Alexandria and then to the Western Front. The 5th and 6th battalions, both heavily depleted, were amalgamated in July 1916, and spent the remainder of war on the Western Front as the 5/6th. After the war, the 6th Battalion remained in Belgium until January 1919 when it moved into Germany, and was reduced to a cadre in October 1919 and sent home to be disbanded. After the war the battalion formed a battery in the 57th (Lowland) Medium Brigade, Royal Garrison Artillery based elsewhere in the city. The drill hall instead became the headquarters of 2 (Scottish) General Hospital and of 155 (Lowland) Field Ambulance. These units evolved to become 50 (Scottish) Casualty Clearing Station in 1967 and that unit amalgamated with other units to form 205 (Scottish) General Hospital in 1967.

After the Edinburgh detachment of 205 (Scottish) General Hospital moved out to the Granton Square drill hall in the late 1990s, the Gilmore Place drill hall was decommissioned and, although the hall itself was demolished, the houses that formed the frontage of the property were returned to residential use.

== Sources ==
- Paterson, Robert H. (2000). Pontius Pilate's Bodyguard: a History of the First or the Royal Regiment of Foot. Edinburgh: The Royal Scots History Committee. ISBN 0-9540906-0-8.
