= Joseph Prosser =

Recipient of the Victoria Cross

- Born: 1828; Moneygall, Ireland
- Died: 10 June 1867 (aged 38–39); Liverpool, England
- Burial place: Anfield Cemetery, Liverpool
- Military career
- Allegiance: United Kingdom
- Branch: British Army
- Rank: Private
- Units: 2nd Battalion, 1st Regiment of Foot
- Conflicts: Crimean War
- Awards: Victoria Cross

Joseph Prosser VC (1828 – 10 June 1867) was an Irish soldier and a recipient of the Victoria Cross, the highest award for gallantry in the face of the enemy that can be awarded to British and Commonwealth forces.

== Military career ==
Prosser was born in Moneygall, King's County. He was approximately 27 years old, and a private in the 2nd Battalion, 1st Regiment (later The Royal Scots), British Army during the Crimean War when the following deed took place for which he was awarded the Victoria Cross.

On 16 June 1855 at Sevastopol, Crimea, when on duty in the trenches, Private Prosser pursued and apprehended (while exposed to enemy cross-fire) a soldier in the act of deserting to the enemy. On 11 August he left the most advanced trench and helped to carry to safety a severely wounded soldier of the 95th Regiment who was unable to move. This act was performed under very heavy fire from the enemy.

== Death and legacy ==
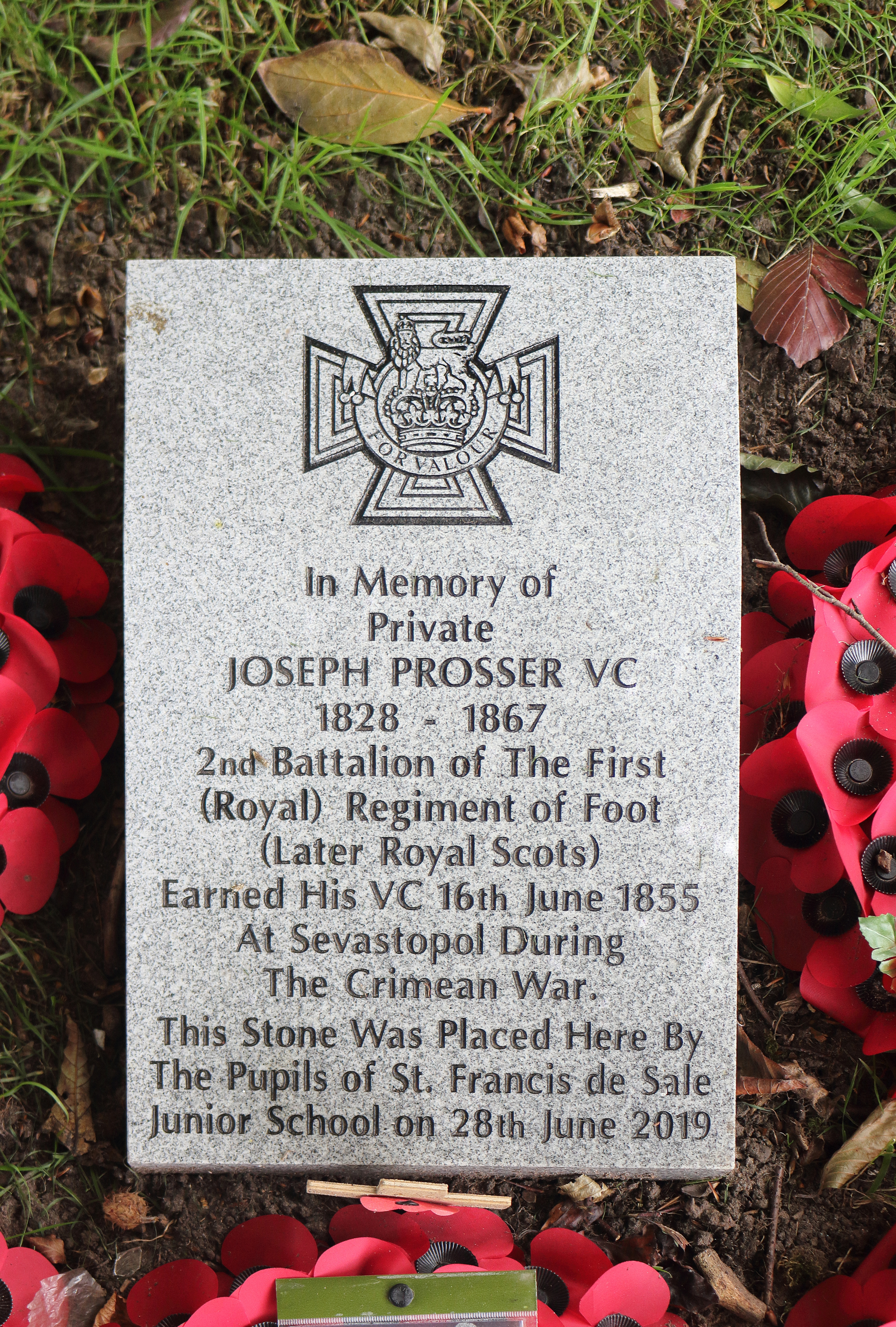
Memorial plaque in Anfield Cemetery

Prosser died on 10 June 1867 in Liverpool, England. He was buried at Anfield Church of England Cemetery, in section 14, grave 389. His grave was unmarked until 1995, when a headstone was erected.

Prosser's Victoria Cross is owned (but not currently displayed) by the Royal Scots Museum in Edinburgh Castle, Scotland.
