= T. W. Barrett =

English music hall comedian and singer

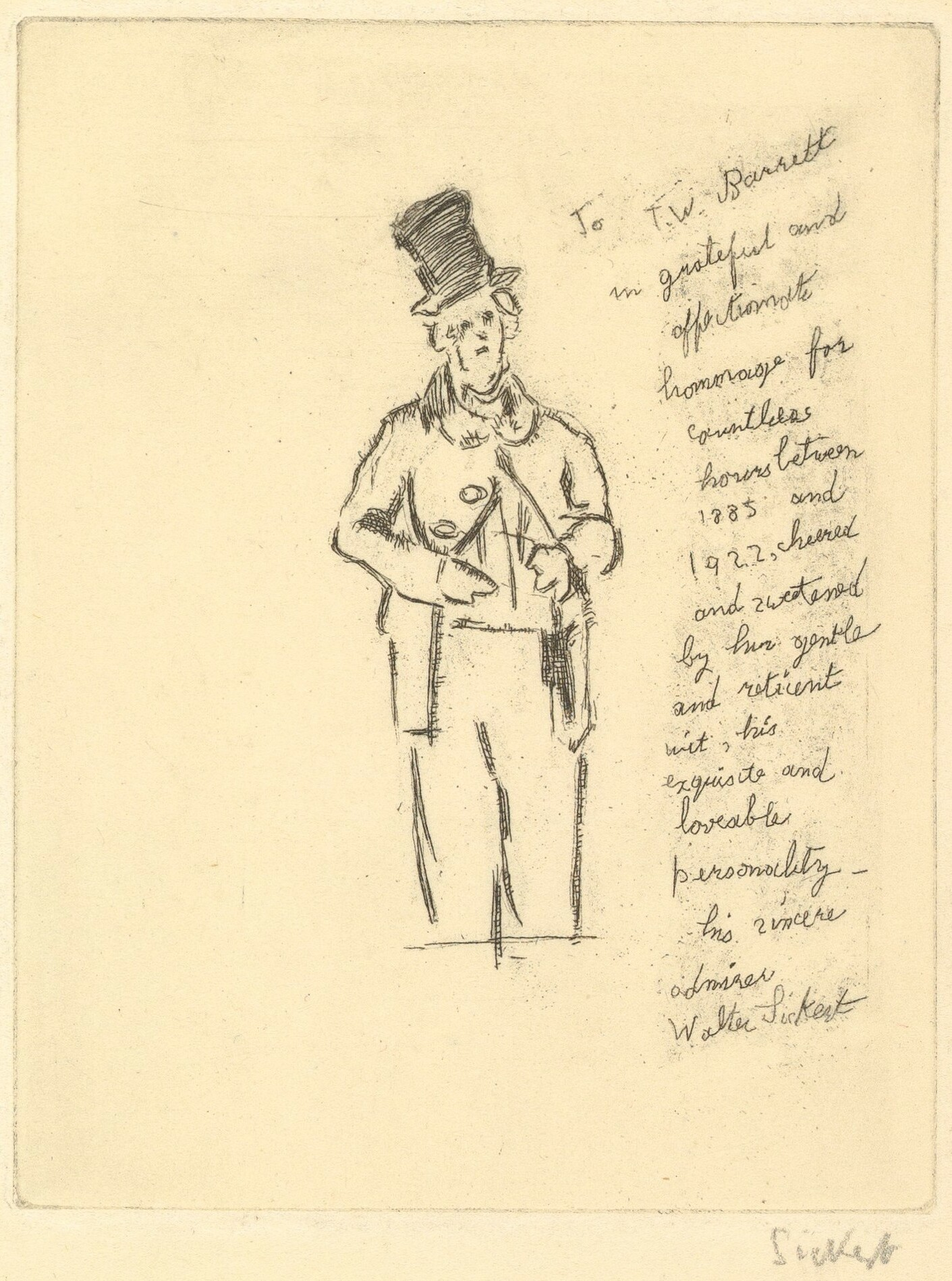
- Sketch by Walter Sickert
- Born: Thomas William Barrett; 1851; Birmingham, England
- Died: 19 April 1935 (aged 83); Liverpool, England
- Occupation: Music hall comedian

Thomas William Barrett (1851 – 19 April 1935) was an English music hall comedian and singer, most popular at the end of the nineteenth century.

He was born in Birmingham, the son of a shoemaker, but at the age of ten was apprenticed as an acrobat. He ran away, and joined a concert party organised by Harry Clifford. On tour, he gradually developed a reputation as a comic entertainer, and made his first appearance in London at Harwood's Varieties in Hoxton in 1878, performing songs that he composed, notably "What a Fool I Must Have Been to Marry Jane". His other songs included "I've Got 'Em On", "The Marquis of Camberwell Green", "I've Been and Got Married Today", "I Don't Like London", and "Jolly as a Sand Boy".

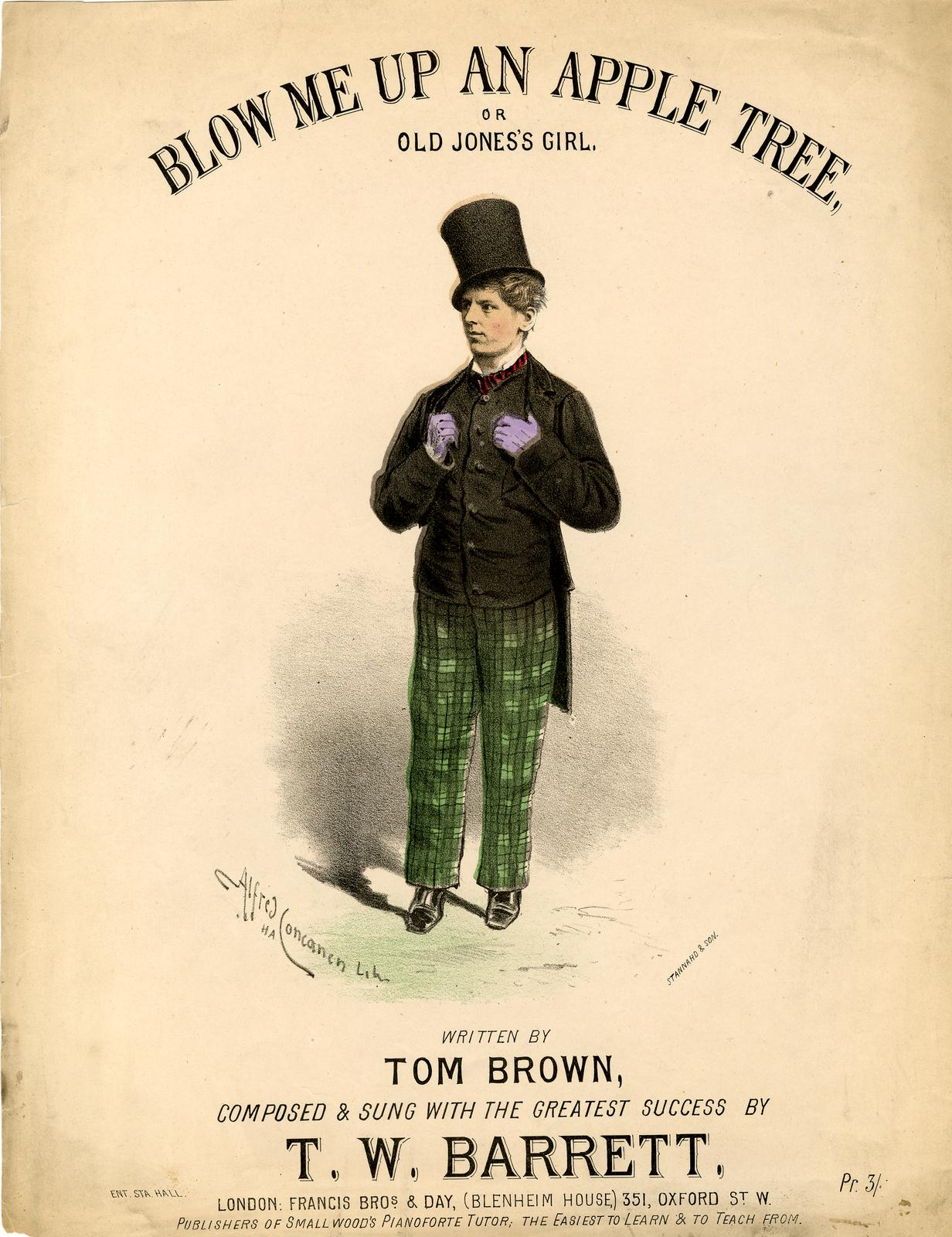
Blow me up an Apple Tree, sheet music

He is credited with being the first comic entertainer to perform in a deadpan manner, standing completely still and without a smile. Despite his modest upbringing, he was billed as "A Nobleman's Son", the title of another of his songs. He was a favourite of the artist Walter Sickert, who sketched him with the inscription: "For countless hours between 1885 and 1922 [he had been] cheered and sweetened by [Barrett’s] gentle and reticent wit [and] his exquisite and lovable personality.” Barrett's style became less fashionable in the early years of the twentieth century, and he performed less often, but in the early 1930s featured as a member of one of Albert de Courville's Veterans of Variety shows, presenting stars of the 1890s.

For the last thirty years of his life, Barrett lived in Liverpool, where he died in 1935 at the age of 83. He was buried at Anfield Cemetery.
