= Anfield Cemetery =

Cemetery in Liverpool, Merseyside, England

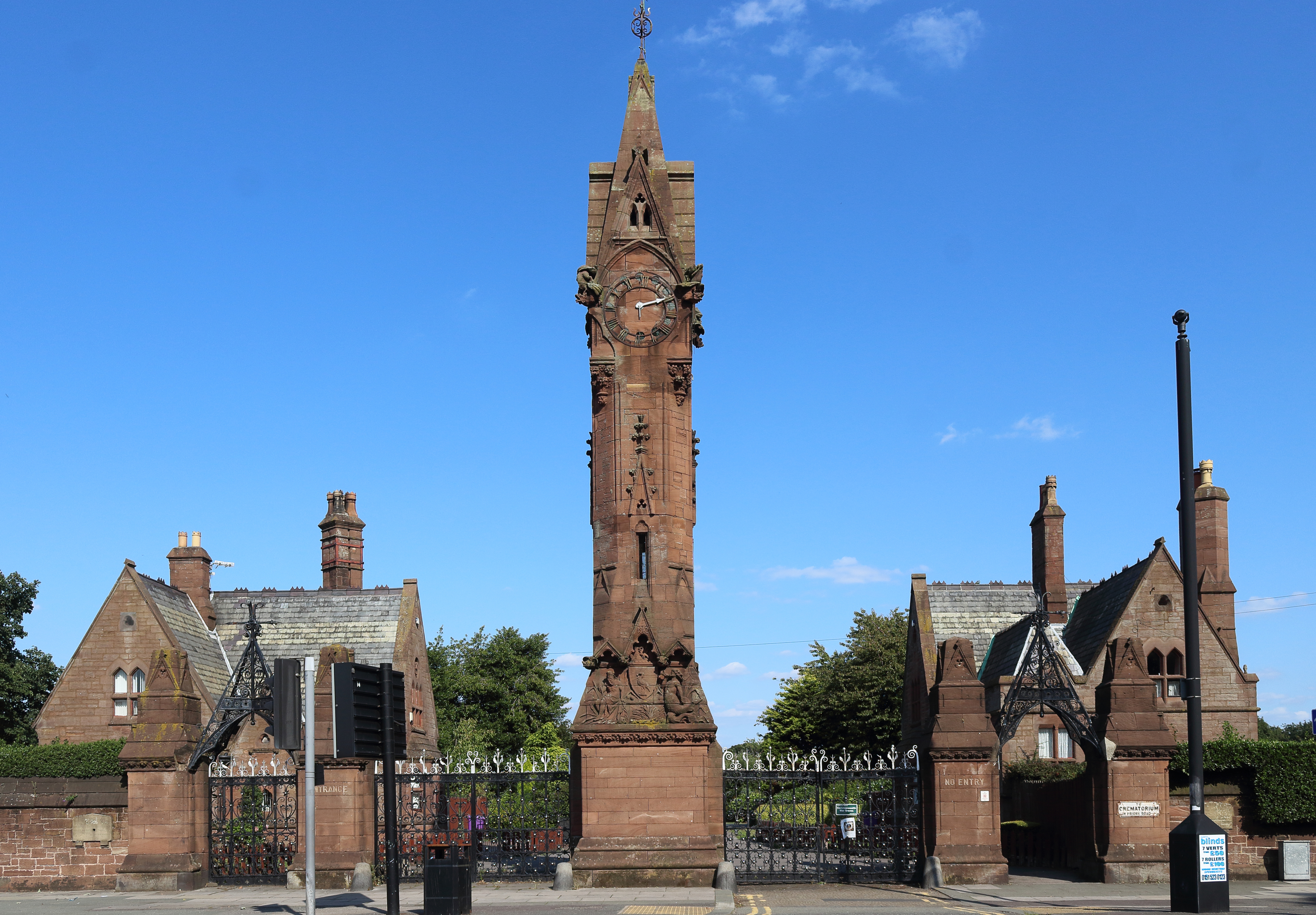
- Main entrance to Anfield Cemetery showing the clock tower and two lodges
- Interactive map of Anfield Cemetery

Details
- Established: August 1863
- Location: Anfield, Liverpool, Merseyside
- Country: England
- Coordinates: 53.4387°N 2.9584°W
- Type: Public
- Owned by: Liverpool City Council
- Website: Anfield Cemetery

Anfield Cemetery, or the City of Liverpool Cemetery, is located in Anfield, a district of Liverpool, Merseyside, England. It lies to the northeast of Stanley Park, and is bounded by Walton Lane (A580 road) to the west, Priory Road to the south, a railway line to the north, and the gardens of houses on Ince Avenue to the east. The cemetery grounds are included in the National Register of Historic Parks and Gardens at Grade II*.

== History ==
By the middle of the 19th century, the burial grounds in town centres had become dangerously overcrowded, and a series of Burial Acts were passed to regulate their further use. In 1854 Liverpool Corporation prohibited any further burials in the city centre graveyards. The first cemetery to be built as a result of this was Toxteth Park Cemetery in 1855–56, but this was to serve a district of Liverpool rather than its centre. In 1860 a competition was held to design a cemetery in Anfield.

Although this was won by Thomas D. Barry, the commission was awarded to William Gay. However, he resigned the following year and the layout of cemetery was designed by Edward Kemp. Building started in 1861. The cost of the cemetery, including the purchase of the land, was over £150,000 (equivalent to £1,650,000 in 2025).

The first burial took place in 1863, and the building of the cemetery was completed the following year. The buildings in the cemetery, including the three chapels, and the entrances and entrance lodges. were designed by the Liverpool architects Lucy and Littler.

In the southern part of the site a crematorium was built in 1894–96. This was erected by the Liverpool Crematorium company, and designed by James Rhind. (Note: This was the first crematorium in Liverpool, and only the fourth to be built in England.) In 1951 a columbarium was built to the southeast of the crematorium.

Two of the original chapels and one of the lodges have been demolished.

== Description ==
The site is roughly diamond-shaped, lying on a northwest–southeast axis, and occupying an area of about 140 acres, 57 hectares. It is bounded mainly by a sandstone wall, and by a short length of fencing. There are four entrances, the main entrance being at the corner of Walton Lane and Priory Road. There are other separate entrances on Walton Lane and on Priory Road, and a fourth entrance at the northeast corner, which is known as the Cherry Lane entrance, and is entered by a bridge under the railway line. A further, separate, entrance, leads to the crematorium. Within the cemetery, an east–west axial path runs between the main entrance and the Cherry Lane entrance, which is crossed by a north–south axial path between the other entrances. At the crossing point is a sunken rectangular area with apsidal ends. To the south of this is the remaining chapel, (Note: The existing chapel was originally the Nonconformist Chapel. The Roman Catholic Chapel stood to the north, and the Anglican chapel to the east, of the crossing point.) and to the east are two buildings known as the North and South Catacombs.

== Listed buildings ==
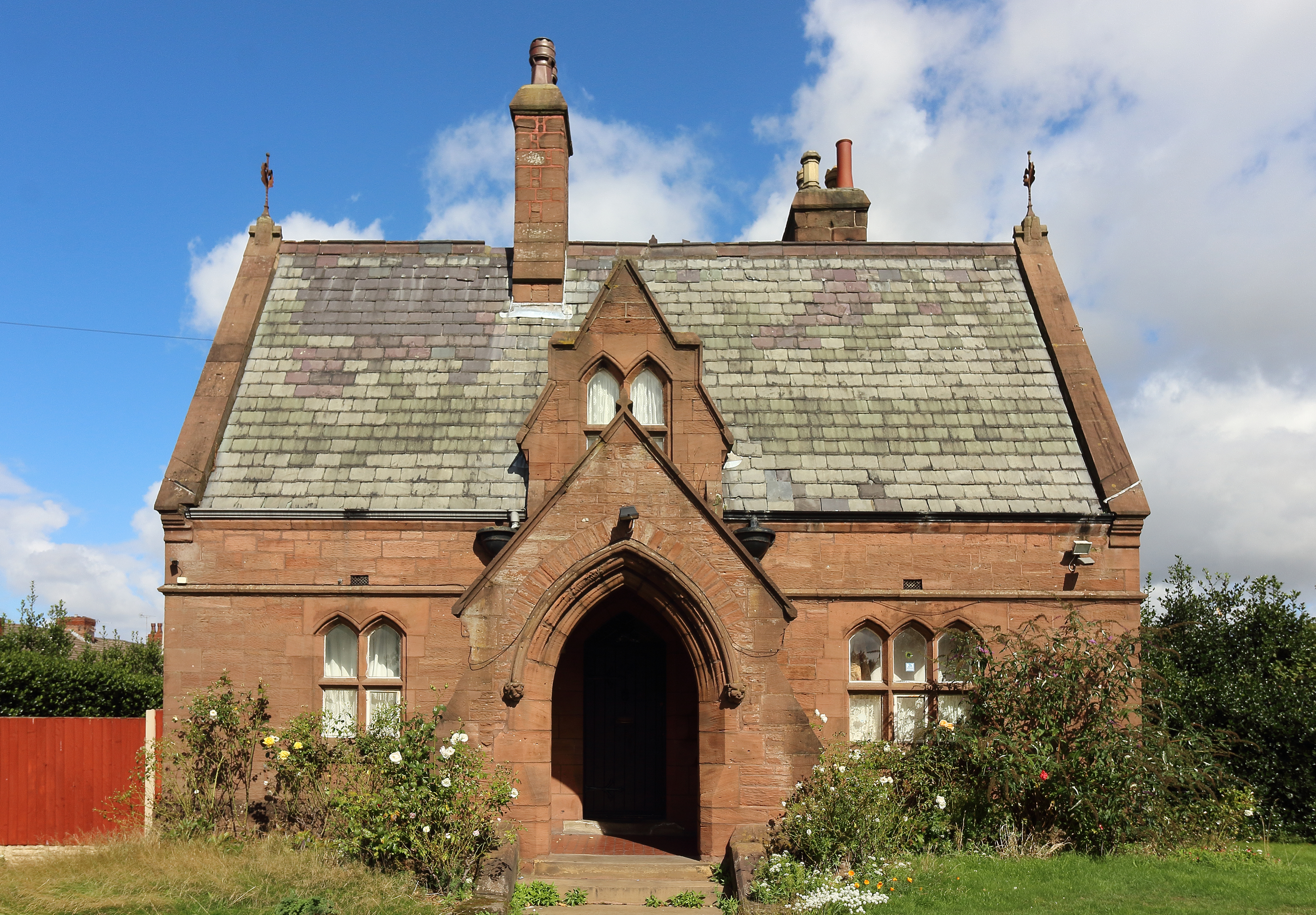
Walton Lane Lodge

Associated with the cemetery are twelve buildings that are designated by English Heritage as Grade II listed buildings. All are constructed in sandstone. The main entrance consists of two carriageways with gate piers between and flanking them. The central gate pier is enlarged to form an octagonal clock tower with Gothic features, including a gabled top and pinnacles. The carriageways contain iron gates. Flanking the carriageways are pedestrian entrances, above which are iron canopies. There is a lodge to the north and another to the south of the main entrance. The north lodge is in one storey with an attic. It has an L-shaped plan with a porch in the angle. To the right of this is a canted bay window, above which is a window containing the coat of arms of the city. The south lodge also has a single storey with an attic, and contains windows with pointed arches and transoms. In the centre is a gabled porch with a pointed arched entrance, above which is a dormer. The Cherry Lane entrance incorporates a bridge under the railway. It has a central carriageway, which is flanked by footways. Its features include castellated portals each of which has a tourelle, coats of arms of the city, and fine gates. The entrances on Walton Lane and Priory Road are similar to each other. They consist of four gate piers with moulded bases, which are surmounted by pyramidal finials. Between the piers are ornamental wrought iron gates. To the south of the Priory Road entrance is another lodge, also in a single storey with an attic, which is similar to the lodge to the south of the main entrance. In Priory Road is the former registrar's office. This has an irregular plan, and is in two storeys and five bays. It contains bay windows, the other windows being mullioned and transomed.

Inside the cemetery is the one remaining chapel, which originally served the Nonconformists. This is constructed in stone with a slate roof, in Early English style. It consists of a nave with an apse, and north and south aisles, each of which ends in a porch. Above the north porch is a steeple, which contains two-light louvred bell openings with gargoyles and pinnacles, and is surmounted by a spire with lucarnes. Flanking the site of the former Anglican chapel are two entrances to former catacombs. From these, coffins were carried by hydraulic lifts down to a crypt about 25 feet (8 m) beneath the ground. The crypt contains four passages, which are lined on each side by recesses for the coffins. Above ground are buttressed arcades in nine bays with corbelled parapets and gargoyles. The entrances to the catacombs are now blocked.

The crematorium is in Perpendicular style, and has a T-shaped plan. Its tower, a disguised chimney, includes louvred bell openings, gargoyles, and an embattled parapet.

Because of the state of the one remaining chapel, now unused, and the poor condition of the catacombs, the site has been placed on the Heritage at Risk Register of English Heritage.

== Memorials and burials ==
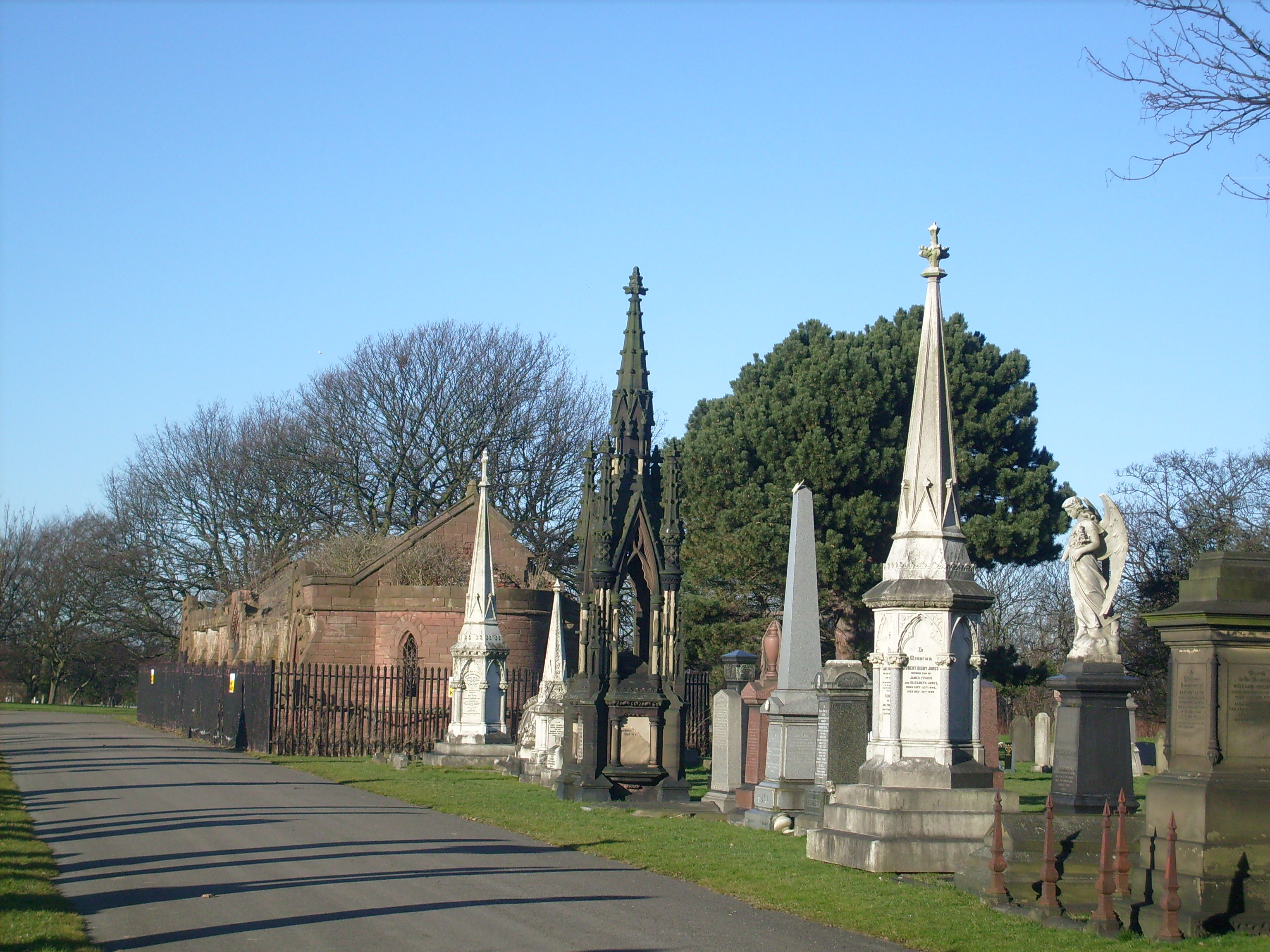
General view with one of the catacombs in the background

The only listed memorial is to Alexander McLennan, who died in 1893, and his wife. It is in granite, and is in the form of an Egyptian pylon. Notable monuments identified by Pollard and Pevsner in the Buildings of England series are a memorial in the form of a Celtic cross to John Highmett, who died in 1890, a granite sarcophagus to Robert Daglish, who died in 1904, and a pinnacled Gothic canopy to William Bottomley Bairstow, who died in 1868.

In the central sunken area is a memorial to those who died serving in the First World War and are buried here. This consists of a Stone of Remembrance by Sir Edwin Lutyens, and a Cross of Sacrifice by Sir Reginald Blomfield. Elsewhere is a memorial to the citizens of Liverpool who died in the Liverpool Blitz in 1941. This stands by a communal grave of 554 people, 373 of whom are unidentified. The Commonwealth War Graves Commission record 997 Commonwealth service personnel buried or commemorated here who were casualties of the two world wars, and screen walls inscribed with their names, and the crematorium has a memorial to 47 others from the Second World War who were cremated here. There are also 67 foreign national war graves, chiefly Dutch and Norwegian seamen, as well as a Second World War soldier of the Soviet Russian Army.

Burials in the cemetery include artist, William G. Herdman, (1805–1882); boxer, Jem Mace (died 1910); T. J. Hughes, founder of a chain of shops bearing his name; four recipients of the Victoria Cross: Patrick Mylott (1820–1878) and John Kirk (1827–1865), (both of whom served in the Indian Mutiny); Joseph Prosser, (1828–1867) (who served in the Crimean War); and Donald Dickson Farmer, (1877–1956) (who served in the Second Boer War); cotton merchant, James Maybrick (1838–1889); opera singer, Aynsley Cook (1833–1894); footballer, Joe Fagan (1921–2001); singer, Michael Holliday (1924–1963); musician, Rory Storm (1938–1972); newspaper proprietor, Michael James Whitty (1793–1873); T. W. Barrett, Music Hall comedian, (died 1935); William Herbert Wallace (1878–1933), who was convicted, then acquitted, of murdering his wife; Liverpool F.C.'s longest serving manager Tom Watson (1859-1915); and author, Brian Jacques (1939-2011).
