= Deadpan =

Emotional neutrality that contrasts comedy

Deadpan, dry humour, or dry-wit humour is the deliberate display of emotional neutrality or no emotion, commonly as a form of comedic delivery, to contrast with the ridiculousness or absurdity of the subject matter. The delivery is meant to be blunt, ironic, laconic, or apparently unintentional.

== Etymology ==
The term deadpan first emerged early in the 20th century, most likely during the 1920s, as a compound word (sometimes spelled as two words) combining "dead" and "pan" (a slang term for the face). It appeared in print as early as 1915, in an article about a former baseball player named Gene Woodburn written by his former manager Roger Bresnahan. Bresnahan described how Woodburn used his skill as a ventriloquist to make his manager and others think they were being heckled from the stands. Woodburn, wrote Bresnahan, "had a trick of what the actors call 'the dead pan.' He never cracked a smile and would be the last man you would suspect was working a trick."

George M. Cohan, in a 1908 interview, had alluded to dead pans without using the actual term "deadpan". Cohan, after returning from a trip to London, told an interviewer: "The time is ripe for a manager to take over about a dozen American chorus girls and wake up the musical comedy game. The English chorus girls are dead–their pans are cold.”

The Oxford English Dictionary cites a 1928 New York Times article as having the first appearance of the term in print. That article, a collection of film slang compiled by writer and theatrical agent Frank J. Wilstach, defines "dead pan" as "playing a role with expressionless face, as, for instance, the work of Buster Keaton." Several other uses of the term, both in theater and in sports, have been identified between the 1915 Bresnahan article and the 1928 article in the Times.

The usage of deadpan as a verb ("to speak, act, or utter in a deadpan manner; to maintain a dead pan") is recorded at least as far back as 1942.

== Examples ==
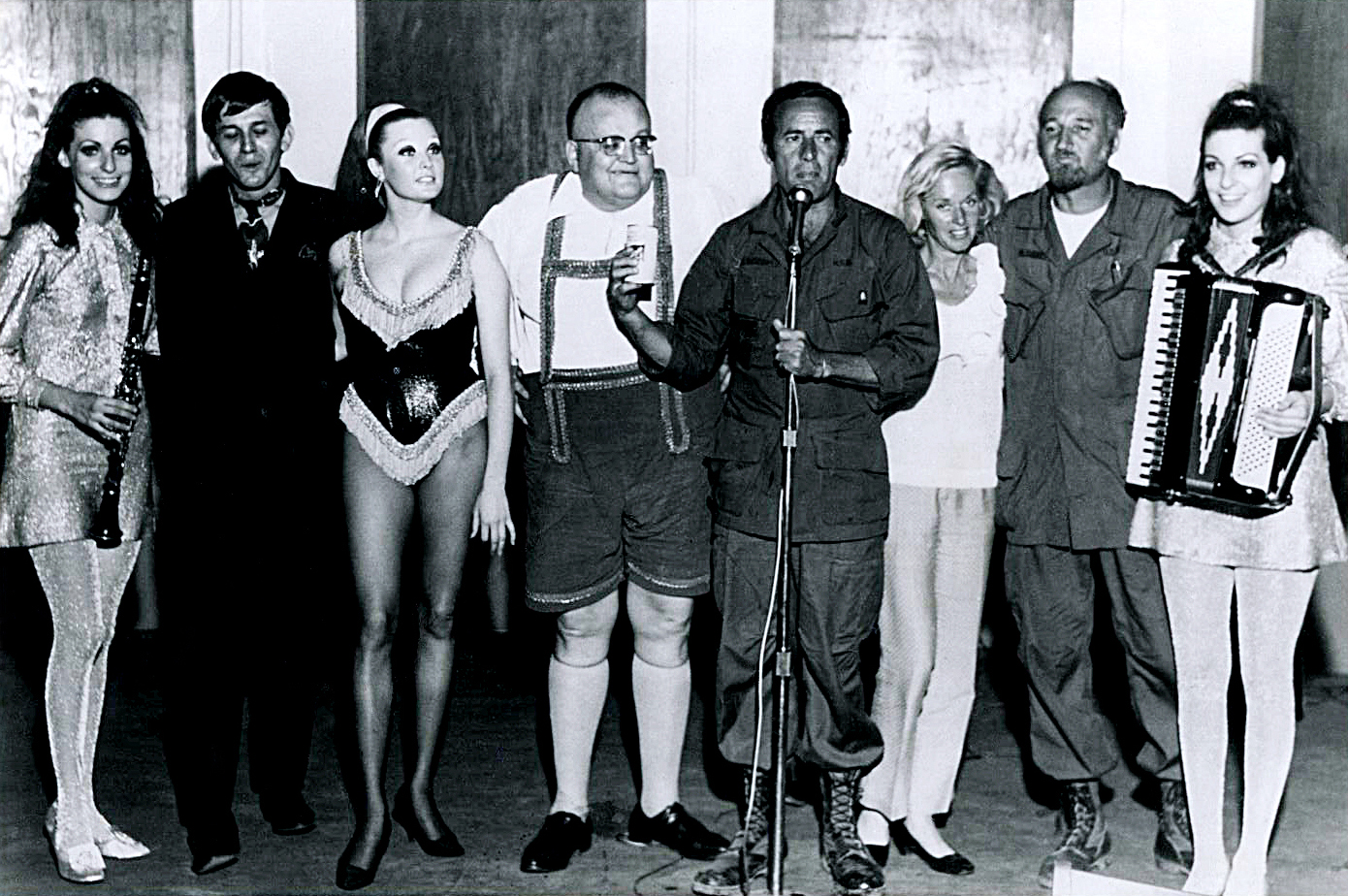
Rat Pack comedians Joey Bishop and Brad Jewell, noted for their deadpan style, with Jennie and Terrie Frankel (Doublemint Twins), Sig Sakowicz, Tony Diamond, Sara Sue, Tippi Hedren and Mel Bishop

The English music hall comedian T. W. Barrett, working in the 1880s and 1890s, is credited with being the first to perform in a deadpan manner, standing completely still and without a smile.

Early in his vaudeville days, Buster Keaton developed his deadpan expression. Keaton realized that audiences responded better to his stony expression than when he smiled, and he carried this style into his silent film career. The 1928 Vitaphone short film The Beau Brummels, with vaudeville comics Al Shaw and Sam Lee, was performed entirely in deadpan. The 1980 film Airplane! was performed almost entirely in deadpan; it helped relaunch the career of one of its supporting actors, Leslie Nielsen, who transformed into a prolific deadpan comic after the film. Actor and comedian Bill Murray is known for his deadpan delivery.

Several American television comedies have emphasized deadpan deliveries of dry humour, including Bob Newhart in The Bob Newhart Show, and much of the casts in Curb Your Enthusiasm, Arrested Development, and My Name Is Earl. Other examples include recent examples are Andre Braugher as Captain Raymond Holt from the TV show Brooklyn Nine-Nine, Matthew Perry as Chandler Bing in Friends, Nick Offerman as Ron Swanson and Aubrey Plaza as April Ludgate in Parks and Recreation, Jennette McCurdy as Sam Puckett in iCarly, and Louis C.K. in Louie. Another example is the comedy of Steven Wright.

Deadpan delivery runs throughout British humour. In television sitcoms, John Cleese as Basil Fawlty in Fawlty Towers and Rowan Atkinson as Edmund Blackadder in Blackadder are both frustrated figures who display little facial expression in their put-downs. Atkinson also plays authority figures (especially priests) while speaking absurd lines with a deadpan delivery. Monty Python include it in their work, such as "The Ministry of Silly Walks" sketch. For his deadpan delivery Peter Sellers received a BAFTA for Best Actor for I'm All Right Jack (1959). A leading figure of the British satire boom of the 1960s, Peter Cook delivered deadpan monologues in his double act with Dudley Moore. In his various roles Ricky Gervais often draws humour from an exasperated sigh. While in his various guises such as Ali G and Borat, the comedian Sacha Baron Cohen interacts with unsuspecting subjects not realising they have been set up for self-revealing ridicule; on this The Observer states, "his career has been built on winding people up, while keeping a deadpan face."

Deadpan delivery is a particular staple of New Zealand comedy, with Flight of the Conchords being the best-known example internationally.

Dry humour is often confused with highbrow or egghead humour, because the humour in dry humour does not exist in the words or delivery. Instead, the listener must look for humour in the contradiction between words, delivery and context. Failure to include the context or to identify the contradiction results in the listener finding the dry humour unfunny. However, the term "deadpan" itself actually refers only to the method of delivery.

== See also ==
- Blank expression
- Dark humor
- Minimisation (psychology)
- Straight man
- Throwaway line
