= Patrick Mylott =

- Born: June 1820; Claremorris, County Mayo, Ireland
- Died: 22 December 1878 (aged 58); Liverpool, England
- Burial place: Anfield Cemetery
- Military career
- Allegiance: United Kingdom
- Branch: British Army
- Rank: Sergeant
- Units: 84th Regiment of Foot
- Conflicts: Indian Mutiny
- Awards: Victoria Cross

Patrick Mylott, VC (June 1820 – 22 December 1878) was an Irish soldier and a recipient of the Victoria Cross, the highest award for gallantry in the face of the enemy that can be awarded to British and Commonwealth forces.

== Military career ==
Mylott was born in Hollymount, Claremorris, County Mayo. In 1839, he briefly attended Trinity College Dublin, before enlisting in the army. He was approximately 37 years old, and a private in the 84th Regiment of Foot (later the 2nd Battalion, York and Lancaster Regiment), British Army during the Indian Mutiny when the following deeds took place for which he was awarded the Victoria Cross:

For being foremost in rushing across a road, under a shower of balls, to take an opposite enclosure; and for gallant conduct at every engagement at which he was present with his Regiment, from 12th of July, 1857, to the relief of the garrison.

Elected by the private soldiers of the Regiment

Mylott later achieved the rank of sergeant. He died in Liverpool, Lancashire on 22 December 1878.

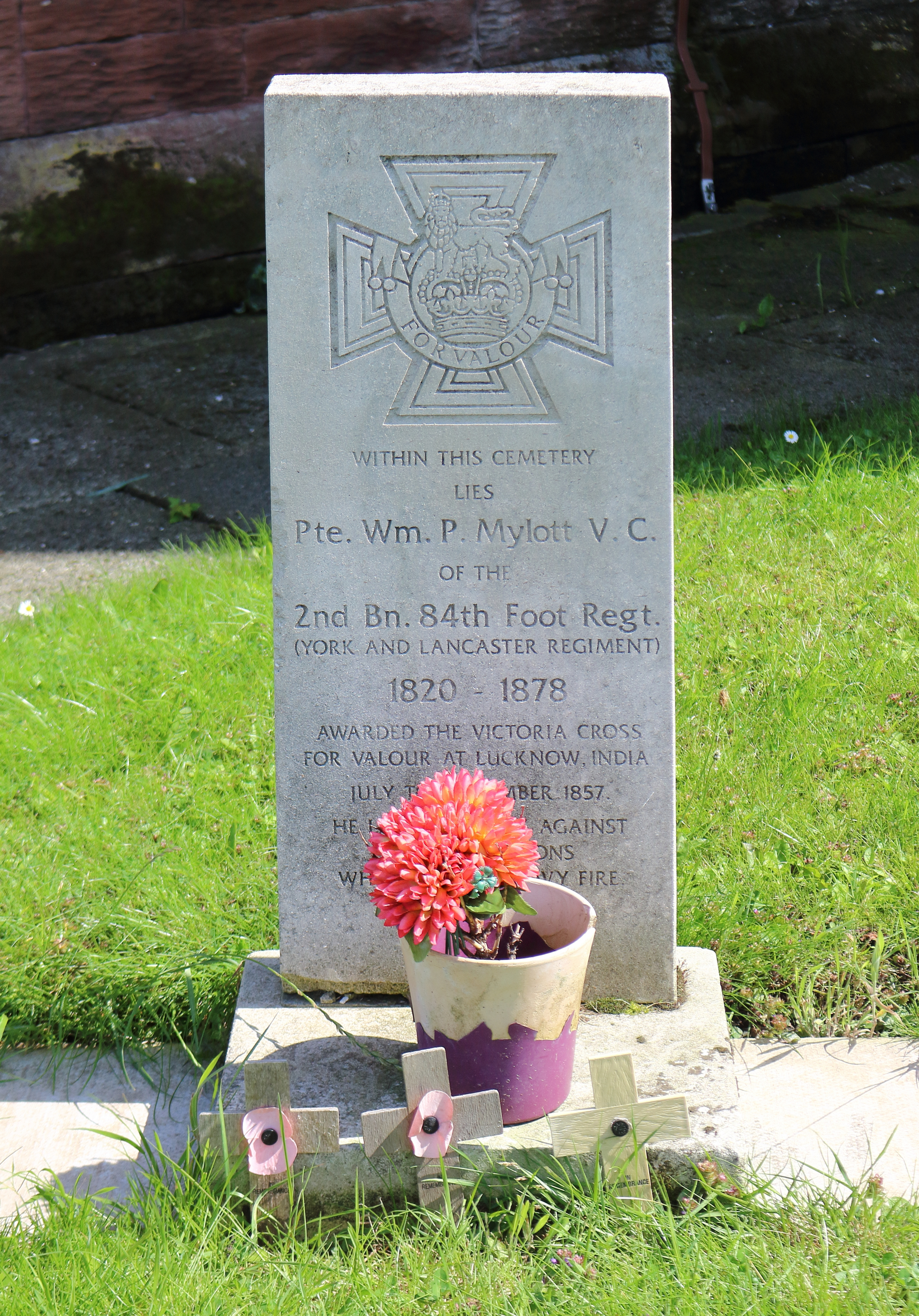
CWGC gravestone in Anfield Cemetery
