= Matthew Rosamund =

English recipient of the Victoria Cross

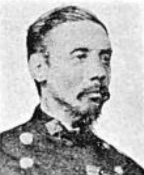
- Born: 12 July 1823; St. Neots, Huntingdonshire
- Died: 14 July 1866 (aged 43); Red Sea
- Burial place: Buried at sea
- Military career
- Allegiance: (United Kingdom of Great Britain and Ireland) United Kingdom
- Branch: Bengal Army; British Indian Army
- Rank: Lieutenant
- Conflicts: Indian Mutiny
- Awards: Victoria Cross

Matthew Rosamund (also spelled Rosamond) VC (12 July 1823 – 14 July 1866) was an English recipient of the Victoria Cross, the highest and most prestigious award for gallantry in the face of the enemy that can be awarded to British and Commonwealth forces.

The christening record for Matthew Rosamond in 1823 shows his parents as George Rosamond and his wife Elizabeth. Matthew Rosamond married Bridget Mahoney in Agra, West Bengal on 21 July 1851. The English 1861 census for Eaton Socon in Bedfordshire, shows Matthew Rosamond home from India five years before his death. Just prior to his death, he married Alice Wollen in 1865 in Serampore, Bengal, India.

Rosamund was born in the village of St. Neots, Huntingdonshire (some records say Swallow Cliffe, Wiltshire; others say Seaton Town, Bedfordshire), the son and grandson of soldiers.

== Victoria Cross ==
Rosamund was 33 years old, and a sergeant-major in the 37th Bengal Native Infantry, Bengal Army during the Indian Mutiny when the following deed on 4 June 1857 at Benares led to the award of the Victoria Cross for Rosamund, Sergeant-Major Peter Gill and Private John Kirk:

This Non-Commissioned Officer volunteered to accompany Lieutenant-Colonel Spottiswoode, Commanding the 37th Regiment of Bengal Native Infantry, to the right of the Lines, in order to set them on fire, with the view of driving out the Sepoys,—on the occasion of the outbreak at Benares, on the evening of the 4th of June, 1857; and also volunteered, with Serjeant-Major Gill, of the Loodiana Regiment, to bring off Captain Brown, Pension Paymaster, his wife and infant, and also some others, from a detached Bungalow, into the Barracks. His conduct was highly meritorious, and he has been since promoted.

Rosamund later achieved the rank of lieutenant but died on board ship and was buried in the Red Sea at the age of 43. His VC medal was sold at auction in 1903 and has not been located since.

A blue plaque has been erected in the village of Eaton Socon in Bedfordshire with the correct spelling of his surname which reads "Matthew Rosamond VC – On 4th June 1857 Matthew Rosamond, a relative of the Rosamond bakers on this site, won the Victoria Cross during the Indian Mutiny. He died on the Red Sea on 14th July 1866 and was buried at sea. This building was built by Budd's Bakers as a new bakehouse around 1930, replacing a much older timber framed property."
