= Peter Gill (VC) =

Irish recipient of the Victoria Cross

- Born: September 1831; Dublin, Ireland
- Died: 26 July 1868 (aged 36); Morar, British India
- Burial place: Artillery Lines Cemetery, Gwalior
- Military career
- Allegiance: United Kingdom
- Branch: Bengal Army; British Indian Army
- Rank: Lieutenant
- Conflicts: Indian Mutiny
- Awards: Victoria Cross

Peter Gill VC (September 1831 – 26 July 1868) was born in St Paul's Parish, Dublin and was an Irish recipient of the Victoria Cross, the highest and most prestigious award for gallantry in the face of the enemy that can be awarded to British and Commonwealth forces.

== Details ==
Gill was approximately 25 years old, and a sergeant-major in the Loodiana Regiment, during the Indian Mutiny on 4 June 1857 at Benares, India when he (and Sergeant-Major Matthew Rosamund) were awarded the Victoria Cross for the following deeds:

This Non-Commissioned Officer also conducted himself with gallantry at Benares, on the night of the 4th of June, 1857. He volunteered, with Serjeant-Major Rosamond, of the 37th Regiment of Bengal Native Infantry, to bring in Captain Brown, Pension Paymaster, and his family, from a detached Bungalow to the Barracks, as above recorded, and saved the life of the Quartermaster-Sergeant of the 25th Regiment of Bengal Native Infantry, in the early part of the evening, by cutting off the head of the Sepoy who had just bayonetted him. Serjeant-Major Gill states, that on the same night he faced a Guard of 27 men, with only a Serjeant's sword; and it is also represented that he twice saved the life of Major Barrett, 27th Regiment of Bengal Native Infantry, when attacked by Sepoys.

Gill later achieved the rank of lieutenant. He was killed in action at Morar, Gwalior, Madhya Pradesh, India, on 26 July 1868.
