= Dalmeny Street drill hall =

Military building in Edinburgh, Scotland

- Edinburgh, Scotland
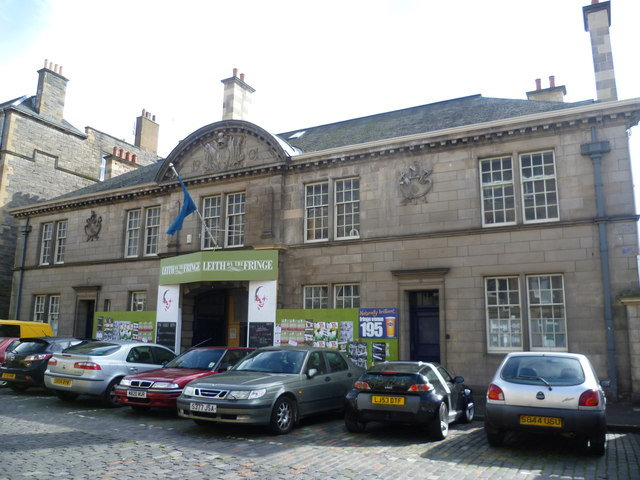
- Dalmeny Street drill hall

Site information
- Type: Drill hall
- Owner: Out of the Blue Arts and Education Trust
- Open to the public: Yes

Location
- Location in Edinburgh
- Coordinates: 55.9646°N 3.1742°W

Site history
- Built: 1901
- Built for: War Office
- Architect: Sir Robert Rowand Anderson
- In use: 1901 – 1999

The Dalmeny Street drill hall in Edinburgh, was built as a military drill hall in 1901, and between 2003 and 2010 was redeveloped as community arts and education centre under the name The Out of the Blue Drill Hall. The drill hall is protected as a category A listed building.

== History ==
The drill hall was designed by Sir Robert Rowand Anderson as the headquarters of the 5th Volunteer Battalion Royal Scots (Lothian Regiment) and was completed in 1901. This unit evolved to become the 7th (Leith) Battalion, The Royal Scots in 1908. The battalion was mobilised at the drill hall in August 1914 before being deployed to Gallipoli. In 1915 the Gretna disaster, the worst crash in the history of British rail travel, killed 227 people and injured 246 others. 102 of those killed were young men from the 7th (Leith) Battalion of the Royal Scots, on their way to Liverpool, where they were to leave for Gallipoli. The bodies of the victims were laid out in the drill hall prior to burial in Rosebank Cemetery, across Leith Walk in Pilrig. The drill hall is therefore connected to one of the greatest tragedies to affect the community of Leith.

The battalion amalgamated with the 9th Battalion to become the 7th/9th (Highlanders) Battalion, The Royal Scots, with its headquarters at the Dalmeny Street drill hall, in 1922. The drill hall was shared with 226 (City of Edinburgh) and 227 (Haddingtonshire) Medium Batteries (Howitzers) of the 57th (Lowland) Medium Brigade, Royal Artillery, which had been formed from the former 6th and 8th Battalions, Royal Scots.

In 1938 the 7th/9th Battalion formed a new 8th Battalion as its duplicate. The 7th/9th Battalion and the 8th Battalion amalgamated to form the 8th/9th Battalion in 1961 and the 8th/9th Battalion was reduced to company size as A (Royal Scots) Company of the 52nd Lowland Volunteers, still at the Dalmeny Street drill hall, in 1967. This unit in turn evolved to become HQ (Royal Scots) Company, Lowland Volunteers. The 52nd Lowland Volunteers moved to the East Claremont Street drill hall, as A (Royal Scots) Company, 52nd Lowland Regiment, in 1999.

== Present use ==
The Dalmeny Street drill hall was decommissioned and sold to the charity Out of the Blue Arts and Education Trust in 2003. The group, with the aid of City Architecture Office, transformed the drill hall into an arts and education centre. The centre, which was fully completed in 2010, incorporates a café, gallery space, artist studios, rehearsal rooms and performance spaces.

As of 2019, the drill hall has been a venue in various cultural and arts festivals, including the Edinburgh Festival Fringe, Leith Festival and the Forest Fringe and has hosted art installations, performances, markets, live music events, exhibitions and community forums for over a decade.
