= The Museum of the Royal Scots (The Royal Regiment) and the Royal Regiment of Scotland =

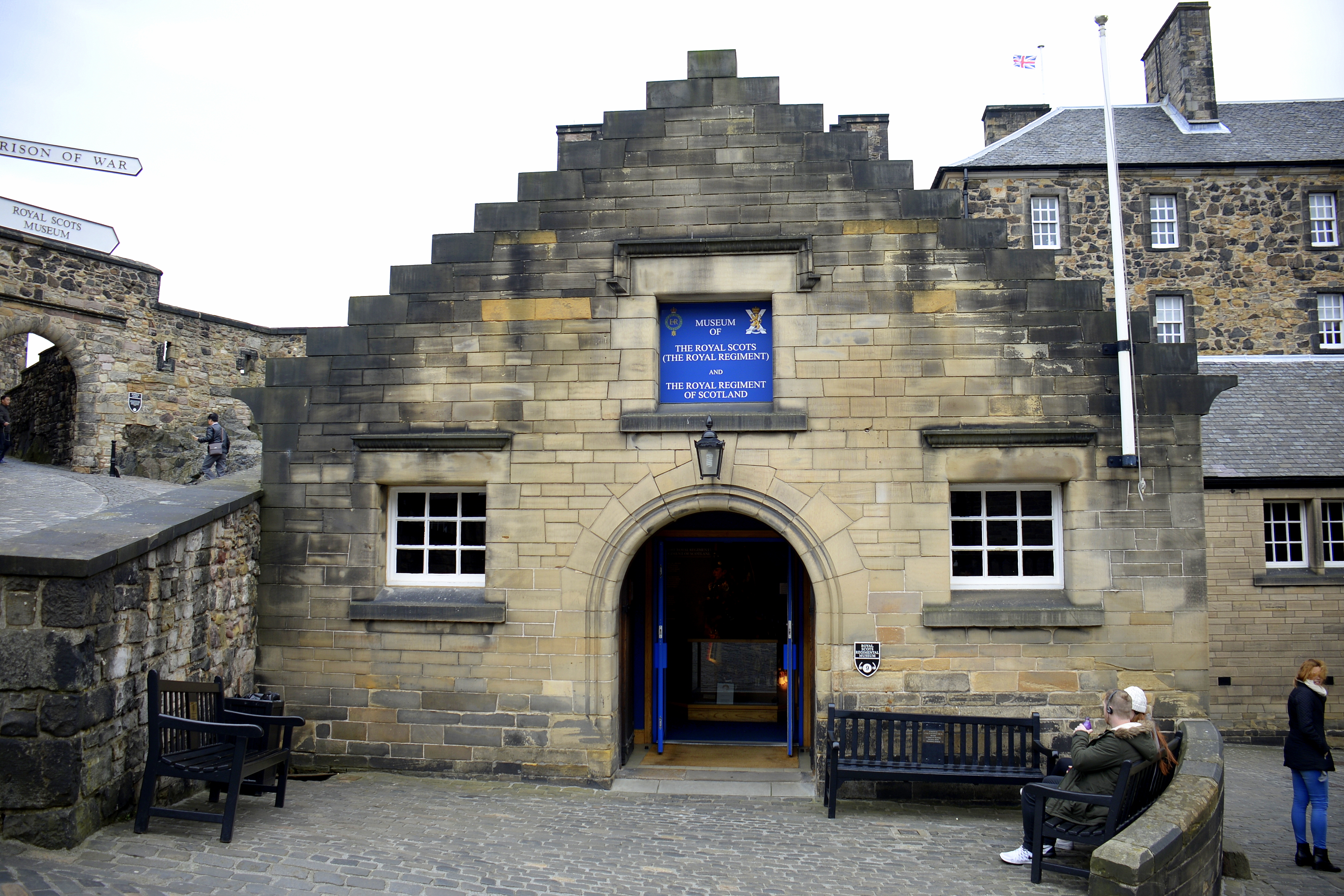
- The Museum of the Royal Scots (The Royal Regiment) and the Royal Regiment of Scotland

- Location within Edinburgh
- Established: 1991
- Location: Edinburgh Castle
- Coordinates: 55.94913°N 3.20014°W
- Website: www.theroyalscots.co.uk/museum/

The Museum of the Royal Scots (The Royal Regiment) and the Royal Regiment of Scotland is a regimental museum displaying the collections of the Royal Scots and the Royal Regiment of Scotland. It is based in the Royal Scots drill hall (built in 1900) at Edinburgh Castle in Scotland.

== History ==
The museum is located in a former drill hall built for the Royal Scots in 1900. The building was re-opened following refurbishment, as the Royal Scots Museum, by the Princess Royal on 27 June 1991. The Royal Regiment of Scotland has been building its own collection since it was formed in 2006. The collections of the Royal Scots and Royal Regiment of Scotland are currently co-located in the Royal Scots drill hall.

== Collections ==
The history of the Royal Scots and its successor regiment, the Royal Regiment of Scotland, from the founding of the Royal Scots by Sir John Hepburn to recent campaigns in Iraq and Afghanistan is illustrated on a series of wall panels together with dioramas, display cases and other exhibits. The museum holds seven Victoria Crosses awarded to members of the Royal Scots. The medal collection is extensive and therefore only a small proportion of the collection is on display: the rest are in drawers which can be opened on request.

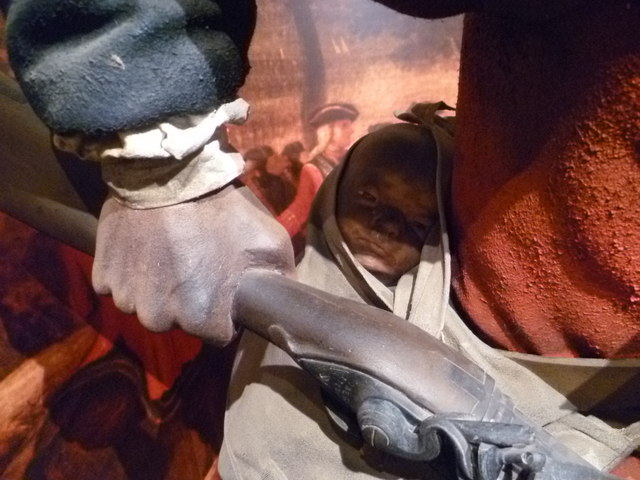
A diorama of Wee McBain, a very young member of the Royal Scots, in his father's backpack at the Battle of Malplaquet in September 1709

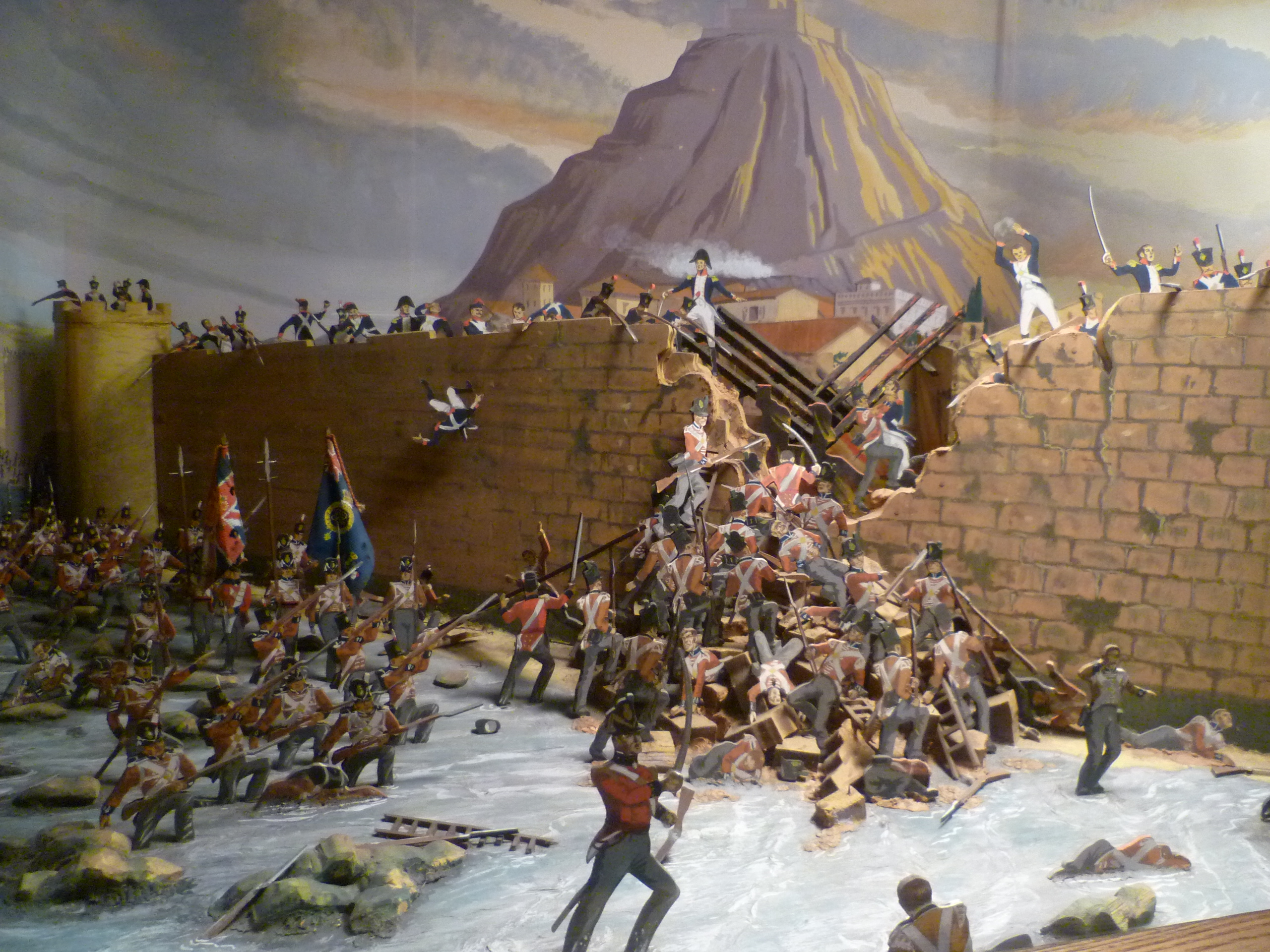
A diorama of the assault by the Royal Scots at the Siege of San Sebastián in July 1813

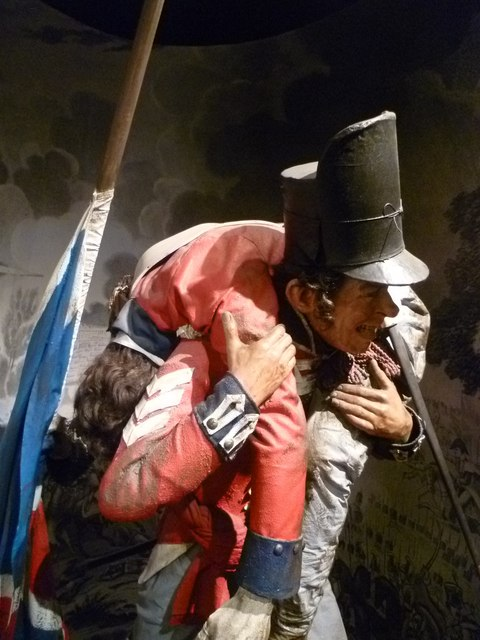
A diorama of a sergeant of the Royal Scots recovering the body of Ensign Grant Stuart Kennedy, the regiment's colour bearer, at the Battle of Waterloo in June 1815
