= LOL (web series) =

British web series

- Created by: Ric Forster
- Directed by: Ric Forster
- Starring: Nicola Mahoney; Bryony Seth; Nico Mirallegro; Dannie Pye; Toni Cummings; Dane Brookes
- Country of origin: United Kingdom
- Original language: English
- No. of episodes: 20

Production
- Running time: 3-5 min.

Original release
- Network: Blip.tv
- Release: November 29, 2008 – 2009

LOL is a web series exploring teen relationships, drug use and social networks. It premiered on Blip on 29 November 2008. There are 20 webisodes in total, ranging between 2 and 5 minutes in length with the last webisode being 10 minutes long. The series was self-funded, with initial help in kind from a local production company. It was shot on a Red One digital cinema camera in 4K.

== Storyline ==
Fueled by peer pressure, 15-year-old Keely Cooper experiments with drugs and physical relationships. The series features a non-linear structure and contains flash forwards, showing scenes set 6 months later.

== Characters ==
- Keely Cooper (Nicola Mahoney) – a bright, introspective 15-year-old who is overly self-critical.
- Jaz Nerini (Bryony Seth) – a headstrong, feisty 16-year-old who is experienced and just wants to have fun.
- Cam Spencer (Nico Mirallegro) – smart and witty, an easy-going guy who continually finds himself an outsider.
- Scott 'Dawber' (Dannie Pye) – a sixth form dropout whose main occupation is getting stoned.
- Milo Peet (Chris Holding) – Cam's scheming friend, who enjoys causing misery for others.
- Tom 'Mase' Mason (Joe Hughes) – Kind and friendly, he tries to see the best in everything.
- Oliver Skellhorn (Micheal Lawrence) – Mase's mate, fling of Jaz's.
- Helen Cooper (Toni Cummings) – Keely's stressed-out single mother.
- PC Kane (Dane Brookes) – new to the job, PC Kane obeys the letter of the law. He hopes to impress DC Wells by helping find out what happened to Keely Cooper.
- James 'Jay' Garner (Andrew Sykes) – Keely, Cam and Jaz's teacher.
- Beth (Victoria Hamnett) – a new friend of Keely's.

== Hollyoaks connection ==
The first three webisodes were filmed on the sets of British soap Hollyoaks at Lime Pictures in Liverpool. In addition, the series stars Nico Mirallegro as Cam Spencer, who is best known for playing Newt in Hollyoaks. Bryony Seth also appeared as series regular Debbie in Hollyoaks spin off Hollyoaks: In the city.
