= Oscar Foronda =

Spanish actor (born 1970)

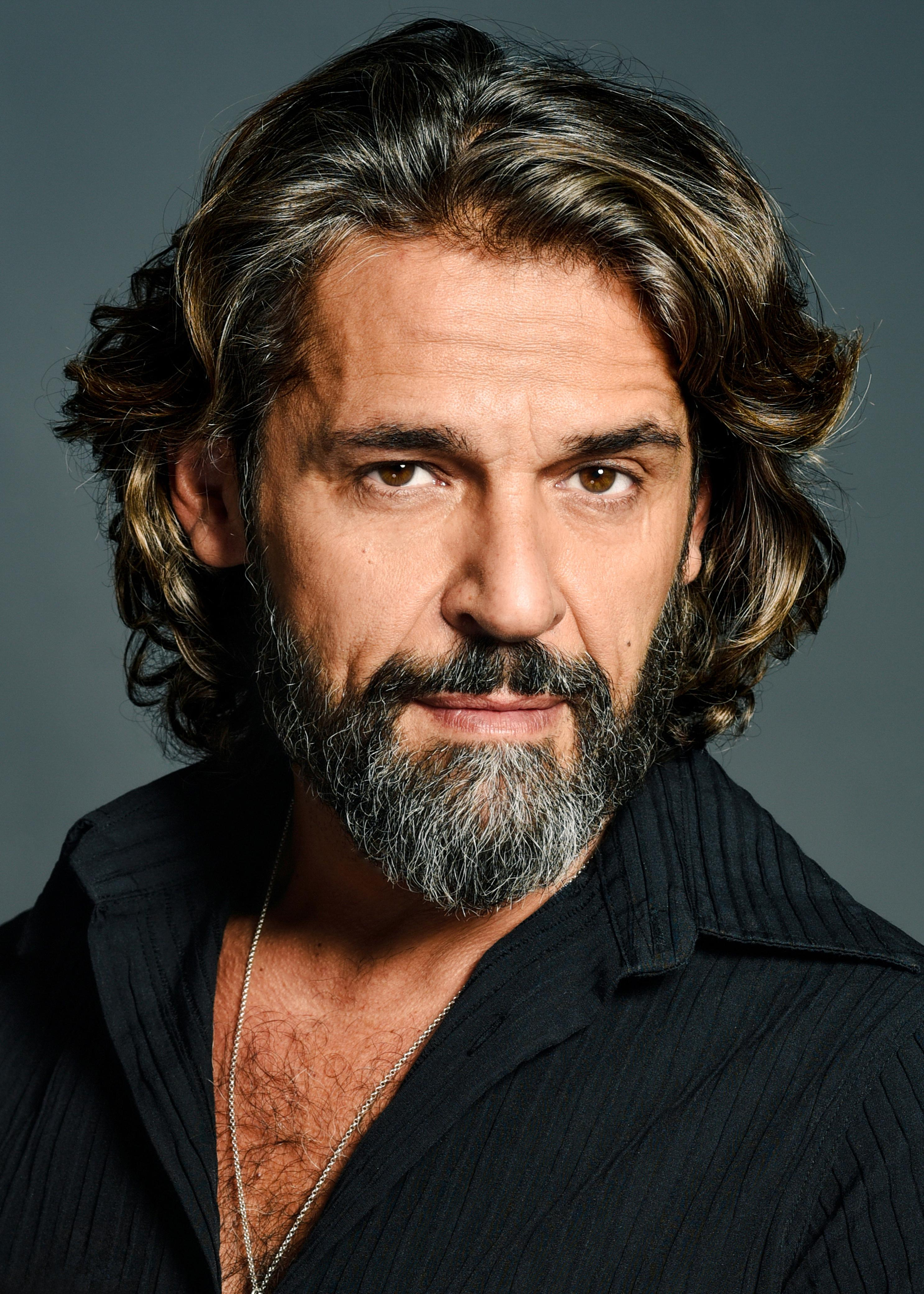
- Oscar Foronda in 2023
- Born: 13 September 1970 (age 55); Barcelona, Spain
- Occupation: Actor
- Years active: 1992–present

Oscar Foronda Pallarés (born 13 September 1970 in Barcelona, Spain) is a Spanish actor who has appeared in over 80 films and television series. In his career he has acted in British, German, Mexican, Swedish, US, Turkish, Arabian, Dutch, French, Korean and Spanish productions.

== Career ==
In the early 1990s, Foronda began his acting career by appearing in commercials and amateur theatre. He then went on to act in various episodes of well-known Spanish TV series, including "El Comisario" and "Los Serrano". His passion for theatre and his talent on stage allowed him to play a "wonderful impassioned" Macduff in Macbeth (2003) at the Barbican Theatre in London, directed by Calixto Bieito. In the years to follow Foronda became a prolific television actor, acting in many Spanish television and film productions.

His international career began in 2010 with an appearance in the British television production Any Human Heart, a mini-series directed by Michael Samuels in which Foronda played the role of Faustino Angel alongside Matthew Macfadyen. In the years to follow he appeared in other international film and TV productions. In 2017 Foronda played a journalist in the German TV series Tatort, Barcelona Krimi (2017). Different and more prominent roles in international projects followed. In 2019 Foronda was seen in the Swedish C-More TV series Gåsmamman with the credited role of the cunning and implacable Colombian drug dealer "El Largo".

In the Sky AtlanticTV series Riviera (2017) Foronda played Argentinian businessman Señor Alvarez,. In Season 4 of the Netflix TV series The Crown (2020), Foronda portrays the historical character Constantino Davidoff, an Argentinian businessman deemed by some as responsible for starting the Falklands War in 1982.

In the BBC 1 TV series The Mallorca Files (2021), Foronda plays Sebastiá Serra, a Mallorcan sous chef.

He has also acted in acclaimed productions in Arab countries in 2022 and 2023.

In addition to acting, he is a writer.

Foronda acts as Branco in the upcoming Paramount plus and Elevenfilms TV show, Stags.

== Filmography ==
=== Television ===
Year	Title	Director	Production
2024	Nine Bodies In A Mexican Morgue	Viviane Andereggen	Sony Pictures
2024	Stags	David Kerr	Paramount+
2023	Mano de Hiero	Lluís Quílez	Netflix
2023	Slave Market	Lasaad Queslati	MBC
2022	Heirs to the Land	Jordi Frades	Netflix
2020	The Mallorca Files	Craig Pickles	BBC
2020	Welcome to Eden	Daniel Benmayor	Netflix
2020	The Crown	Constantino Davidoff	Netflix
2020	Riviera	Sarah Harding	Sky Atlantic
2020	Warrior Nun	Simon Barry	Netflix
2019	Gåsmamman	Richard Holm	Bigster
2017	Still Star-Crossed	Jon Jones	ABC Studios
2017	Tatort	Jochen Alexander Freydank	ZDF
2017	Centro Médico	Raquel Barrero	Eccho Rights
2017	Sé Quién Eres	Pau Freixas	Telecinco, Filmax
2017	Com Si Fos Ahir	Esteve Rovira	TV3
2016	Legend of The Blue Sea	Jin Hyuk	Netflix
2016	Nit i Dia	Manuel Huerga	TV3
1012	Tornarem	Felipe Sole	TV3
2011	Operación Malaya	Manuel Huerga	TVE
2010	Infidels	Sònia Sánchez	TV3
2010	Any Human Heart	Michael Samuels	Channel 4 TV
2010	Hispania, la leyenda	Jorge Sánchez-Cabezudo	Antena 3
2010	Pelotas	José Corbacho	TVE
2008	Ventdelplà	Ignasi Tarruella	TV3
2007	Los Serrano	Begoña Álvarez Rojas	Telecinco
2007	Los hombres de Paco	David Molina Encinas	Antena 3
2006	Hombres	Daniel di Grado	Kanal 5
2004	Porca misèria	Núria Furió	TV3
2004	Hospital Central	Javier Pizarro	Telecinco
2004	El comisario	José Ramos Paíno	Telecinco
1995	Makinavaja	Carlos Suárez	TVE

=== Film ===
Year	Title	Director	Production
2024	The Grand Amir and Donna Maria	Yalkin Tuychiev	Kanguru Yapim
2024	Invasión	Bobby Boermans	Storytellers Film & TV
2023	Run Baby Run	Tony Andújar	Esde Mango Films
2018	The Pact	David Victori	4 Cats Pictures
2017	Incerta Glòria	Agustí Villaronga	Aragón Televisión
2016	All I See Is You	Marc Forster	2DUX²
2015	The Gunman	Pierre Morel	Open Road Films (II)
2013	Ismael	Marcelo Piñeyro	Sony Pictures
2012	Tengo ganas de ti	Fernando González Molina	Atena 3
2010	Julia's Eyes	Guillem Morales	Universal Pictures
2009	[REC]²	Jaume Balagueró	Filmax
2007	Fuerte Apache	Mateu Adrover	Alta Producción
