= Any Human Heart (TV series) =

- British DVD cover
- Genre: Period drama
- Created by: William Boyd
- Based on: Any Human Heart by William Boyd
- Directed by: Michael Samuels
- Starring: Jim Broadbent; Matthew Macfadyen; Sam Claflin
- Composer: Dan Jones
- Country of origin: United Kingdom
- Original language: English
- No. of series: 1
- No. of episodes: 4

Production
- Production locations: Knebworth, England; Barcelona, Spain
- Running time: 60 minutes
- Production company: Carnival Films

Original release
- Network: Channel 4
- Release: 21 November – 12 December 2010

Any Human Heart is a British drama television serial, based on the 2002 novel of the same name by William Boyd. It was announced in April 2010, and was broadcast on Channel 4 from 21 November to 12 December 2010, consisting of four episodes of 70-80 minutes each. A re-edited version aired in the United States on 13, 20 and 27 February 2011 (three one-and-a-half-hour episodes) on PBS.

The serial was awarded Best Drama Serial at the British Academy Television Awards 2011. It was released on DVD on 27 December 2010 and in the US (Region 1) on 5 April 2011.

For international distribution to other streaming channels the originally conceived six part version with 50 minute episodes was produced.

== Cast ==
- Jim Broadbent as Logan Mountstuart (older)
- Matthew Macfadyen as Logan Mountstuart (middle)
- Sam Claflin as Logan Mountstuart (young)
- Conor Nealon as Logan Mountstuart (child)
- Hayley Atwell as Freya Deverell
- Ed Stoppard as Ben Leeping (older)
- Samuel West as Peter Scabius (older)
- Gillian Anderson as Wallis, Duchess of Windsor
- Tom Hollander as Edward, Duke of Windsor
- Kim Cattrall as Gloria Scabius
- Holliday Grainger as Tess Scabius
- Tobias Menzies as Ian Fleming
- Charity Wakefield as Land Fothergill
- Emerald Fennell as Lottie
- Stanley Weber as Swiss Detective
- Valerie Kaprisky as Gabrielle Dupetit
- Theo Cross as Nat Tate
- Tim Flavin as Schmidt
- Oscar Foronda as Faustino Angel
- Lucinda Raikes as Miss Warburton
- Julian Ovenden as Ernest Hemingway
- Lydia Wilson as Monday

== Soundtrack ==
The original music from the series was scored by composer Dan Jones, with performances by the Chamber Orchestra of London, Roger Huckle and John Parricelli. In 2011 it won the BAFTA award for Best Original Television Music and Best Television Soundtrack at the Ivor Novello Awards, and was nominated for best Original Dramatic Score and Outstanding Original Main Title Theme Music at the Emmys. The soundtrack was released in February 2017 by Wave Theory Records.
