= Stags (TV series) =

British television series

- Created by: Daniel Cullen
- Directed by: David Kerr and Giancarlo Sanchez
- Starring: Nico Mirallegro; Charlie Cooper; Asim Chaudhry; Corin Silva; Sophie Lenglinger; Paul Forman; Jojo Macari; Cavan Clerkin; Paulina Gálvez; Oscar Foronda; Cavan Clerkin; Alexandra Masangkay; Aysha Daraaui; Daniel Triana
- Country of origin: United Kingdom
- Original language: English
- No. of series: 1
- No. of episodes: 6

Production
- Executive producers: Joel Wilson; Olivia Trench; Carissa Hope Lynch
- Producer: Farah Abushwesha
- Production location: Canary Islands
- Production company: Eleven Film

Original release
- Network: Paramount+
- Release: 15 August 2024

Stags is a six-part British television series, written and created by Daniel Cullen. It is made for Paramount+ by Eleven Film, with David Kerr as lead director. It was released on 15 August 2024.

== Premise ==
The series follows groom-to-be Stu and his friends on his stag do in South America. What was meant to be a week of drink, drugs, and fun turns dark when instead of boarding a plane home, the group is thrown in to a notorious and depraved prison island run by two drug-dealing siblings and it becomes clear that the stags need to pick a side if they have any chance of survival. Friendships are tested and life-long loyalty is sacrificed as Stu and his friends begin to question, who will make it home?

== Cast ==
- Nico Mirallegro as Stu
- Corin Silva as Ryan
- Charlie Cooper as Ant
- Sophie Lenglinger as Clem
- Jojo Macari as Kai
- Paul Forman as Hugo
- Asim Chaudhry as Greg
- Oscar Foronda as Branco
- Paulina Gálvez as Selma
- Cavan Clerkin as John
- Karl-el Santos as Justo
- Alexandra Masangkay as Luba
- Aysha Daraaui as Gemma
- Daniel Triana as Cisco

== Production ==
This series was commissioned by Sebastian Cardwell, Deputy Chief Content Officer, UK, Paramount. Eleven Film produced it, with Carissa Hope Lynch, Joel Wilson, Olivia Trench, and Jamie Campbell serving as executive producers, and Farah Abushwesha serving as producer.

=== Casting ===
Casting was undertaken by Daniel Edwards Casting and was announced in November 2023, consisting of Nico Mirallegro, Charlie Cooper, Asim Chaudhry, Corin Silva, Sophie Lenglinger, Paul Forman, Jojo Macari, Cavan Clerkin, Paulina Galvez and Oscar Foronda.

=== Filming ===
Filming began in November 2023 on location in Tenerife.

== Release and reception ==
Episodes 1 and 2 were released on Paramount+ on 15 August 2024, with one episode a week released each Thursday following the initial premiere.

=== Critical response ===
The series has received generally positive reviews. Lucy Mangan, reviewing for The Guardian, described the series as "the exhilarating, gorgeous tale of eight idiots" in which a "stellar comic cast beautifully play this chronicle of a pre-wedding South American week of debauchery gone very, very wrong". She awarded the series four stars. Also for The Guardian, Barbara Ellen described the series as a "fast-moving, dark-hearted comedy drama", drawing comparisons to The Hangover and White Lines.

Jon O'Brien from Radio Times said "Stags certainly isn’t your average prison drama" and that director David Kerr "handles the balance of crime and comedy well, ratcheting up the tension one minute and then puncturing it with a macabre quip". However O'Brien added that Stags "wastes its intriguing concept on a bunch of individuals so unlikeable and selfish you start to sympathise with their oppressors", ultimately awarding it three stars.

Commenting on the first episode, Fiona Sturges from Financial Times said that "we don’t yet know enough about these hapless Brits to root for them", describing it as "frenetic". Sturges noted that "while there is the occasional good line, the comedy is muffled by the unpleasantness of their predicament". Ultimately they awarded two stars and added that "there is time, of course, for Stags to find its feet, but so far the vibe is a high-speed montage of every bachelor party movie ever made".

Writing for Air Mail, Jack Sullivan said that "the comedy — and pandemonium — grows" throughout Episode 1. Sullivan added that if viewers were looking for "hyperactive pacing and the thrills of Netflix’s Sex Education" then they should "tune in".
