= Nevrland =

2019 film

- Film poster
- Directed by: Gregor Schmidinger
- Written by: Gregor Schmidinger
- Produced by: Ulrich Gehmacher
- Starring: Simon Frühwirth; Paul Forman
- Cinematography: Jo Molitoris
- Edited by: Gerd Berner
- Production company: Orbrock Film
- Distributed by: Filmladen
- Release date: January 16, 2019 (Filmfestival Max Ophüls Preis)
- Running time: 88 minutes
- Country: Austria
- Languages: German; English

Nevrland is a 2019 Austrian coming-of-age psychological horror film by Gregor Schmidinger, released in 2019 with Simon Frühwirth and Paul Forman in the lead roles. The premiere took place on 16 January 2019 as part of the film festival Max Ophüls Prize, where the film was invited to the competition and won the Prize of the Youth Jury. Lead actor Simon Frühwirth was also honored as Best Newcomer. The Austrian premiere took place in Graz in March 2019. The film was released in fall 2019 by Filmladen.

== Plot ==
17-year-old Jakob lives with his grandfather and father in a small apartment in Vienna. In order to earn some money for his studies, he works as a temporary worker in the slaughterhouse where his father works. Jacob is struggling with an anxiety disorder that makes life increasingly difficult for him. In a sex cam chat, he meets the 26-year-old artist Kristjan. At first, a virtual friendship develops between the two of them, without a real meeting taking place for the time being. Only after a heavy stroke of fate does Jakob gather his courage and make an appointment with Kristjan in his apartment, leading to an extremely unexpected chain of events.

== Cast ==
- Simon Frühwirth as Jacob
- Paul Forman as Kristjan
- Josef Hader
- Wolfgang Hübsch
- Anton Noori

== Festival screenings ==
- 2019 BFI Flare: London LGBT Film Festival
- 2019 TLVFest

== Production ==
The filming took place in March and April 2018 in Vienna and Upper Austria. The film was supported by the Austrian Film Institute, the Vienna Film Fund and the Province of Upper Austria. The Austrian Broadcasting Corporation was also involved. The film was produced by Orbrock Filmproduktion.

== Awards ==
- 2019 Film Festival Max Ophüls Prize
- 2019 Diagonal. Best young actors for Simon Frühwirth by Youth Jury
- 2019 Thomas Pluch Screenplay Award (Special Prize of the Jury, Gregor Schmidinger)
