= Nico Mirallegro =

English actor (born 1991)

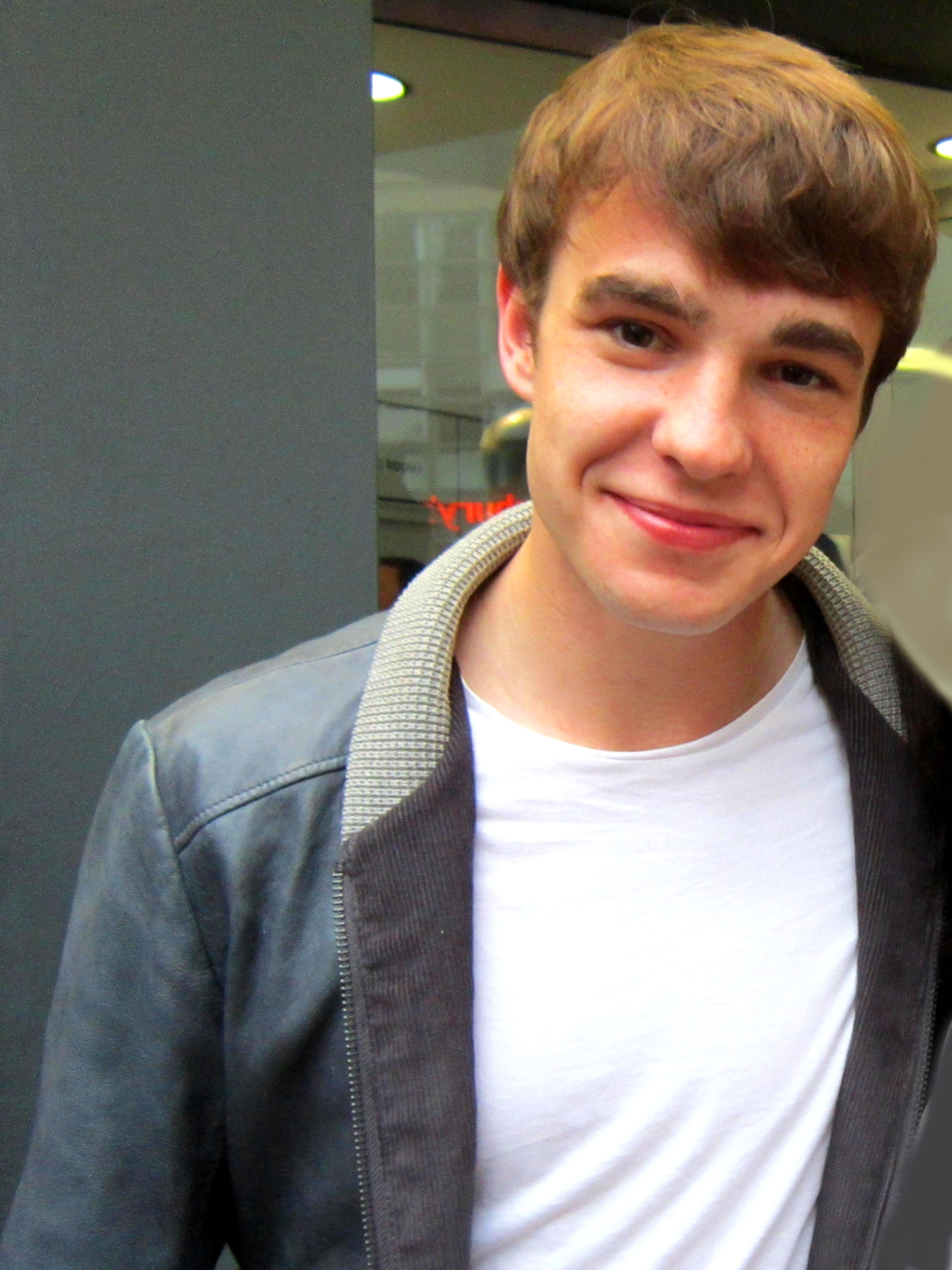
- Mirallegro in June 2013
- Born: 26 January 1991 (age 35); Heywood, Greater Manchester, England
- Occupation: Actor
- Years active: 2007–present

Nico Cristian Mirallegro (/ˌmɪrəˈlɛɡroʊ/ MIRR-ə-LEG-roh; born 26 January 1991) is an English actor and director. He is best known for his roles as Barry "Newt" Newton in the soap opera Hollyoaks (2007–2010), Finn Nelson in My Mad Fat Diary (2013–2015), Joe Middleton in The Village (2013), and Johnjo O'Shea in Common (2014). His feature film credits include Spike Island (2012), Anita B. (2014), The Pass (2016), and Peterloo (2018).

Recognised in 2012 by Screen International as one of its "Stars of Tomorrow", he has been lauded as one of the United Kingdom's "most promising young actors". Among his award nominations are those for Best Actor at the BBC Audio Drama Awards (2016, for Orpheus and Eurydice) and Best Supporting Actor at the BAFTA Awards (2014, for The Village).

== Early life ==
Mirallegro was born on 26 January 1991 in Heywood, Greater Manchester. His Italian father is from Sicily, and his Irish mother, Maureen McLaughlin, is from Malin Head. He briefly attended a boarding school outside the UK, at where he was lonely and felt out of place. He also attended Siddal Moor Sports College in Heywood and the Manchester School of Acting. His parents are separated, and his father lives in Spain, with Mirallegro having moved there as a teenager to live with him for a time. He is conversational in Italian and Spanish.

Mirallegro says that he "fell into" acting in his mid-teens after following his sister Claudia to improv classes. At one of his first acting classes, he was "so scared [he] had to get one of the other lads to say [his] lines".

== Career ==
=== Television ===
Mirallegro's first professional acting role came in 2007, after he was cast as emo teenager Newt in the long-running British soap opera Hollyoaks. Although he voluntarily left Hollyoaks after two years at age 18 to follow other acting projects, he was grateful for the opportunity to appear on the show: "Hollyoaks is where I learnt a lot of the craft, being in front of a camera six days a week. That's certainly an experience you don't get in drama school."

When filming for Hollyoaks, Mirallegro was also playing Cam Spencer in LOL, a web series which explored sex, drugs, and relationships. In 2010, Mirallegro appeared in an episode of the BBC drama series Moving On as a gay youngster who suffers bullying in school because of his sexuality. Beginning 2010, he appeared as an Italian foreign exchange student in nine episodes of the regular BBC series Doctors.

In December 2010, Mirallegro was in series one of the BBC One 1930s-period remake of Upstairs Downstairs. He portrayed a young footman called Johnny Proude, who took up a position in service to escape the poverty of the northern mining town where he was born. The BBC re-commissioned the production for a second series, in which he appeared again as Johnny. In the second series, his character appeared in a boxing tournament, requiring Mirallegro to take boxing lessons for the role. In 2011, Mirallegro appeared in the BBC's three-part psychological thriller Exile, playing the teenage version of leading character Tom Ronstadt. Later that year, he played Sam, a gay heroin addict in the BBC drama The Body Farm.

In 2013, he began playing Finn Nelson, the love interest of the main female character in E4's teen comedy-drama series My Mad Fat Diary. That same year, he also played the role of Joe Middleton in the BBC drama The Village. In 2014, Mirallegro portrayed a teenager prosecuted for murder under the Joint Enterprise law in the controversial BBC One production Common, written by Jimmy McGovern. Called "a bleak, powerful drama thick with political intent", a review started that Mirallegro "continues to prove himself as the best actor ever to graduate from Hollyoaks".

The 2015 television film The Ark told the story of Noah, along with elements from Islamic tradition. Mirallegro portrayed Kenan, (Note: According to the Quran (Hud v. 42–43), Noah had an unnamed son who refused to come aboard the Ark, instead preferring to climb a mountain, where he drowned. Some later Islamic commentators give his name as either Yam or Kan'an. This drama interprets his name as Kenan.) Noah's youngest (and extrabiblical) son, whose wish to follow a path different from his father and brothers results in his being swept away in the Great Flood. Mirallegro also starred in HBO's Virtuoso, directed and partially written by Alan Ball. Set in the 18th century, Mirallegro played a self-taught violin prodigy who travels to Vienna to learn with other young musicians.

In June 2017, Mirallegro acted in the BBC's BAFTA winning real-life drama Murdered for Being Different, about the murder of Sophie Lancaster in 2007. In 2019, it was confirmed he would be cast as a British Army soldier in the new series of the long-running BBC One drama Our Girl.

In November 2023, it was announced by Paramount+ that Mirallegro would star in a new original drama series Stags, filming on location in Tenerife and due to be released in 2024.

=== Film ===
Mirallegro's first film, the short film Six Minutes of Freedom, was shot in 2009. He starred as a troubled teenager training to be a boxer while his father is in prison. The film was entered into four film festivals, and it won Best New Wave Short Film at the Yellow Fever Independent Film Festival.

Mirallegro portrayed a teenage lead guitarist in a full-length film set in the 1990s about the Manchester-formed rock band The Stone Roses. The film, Spike Island, was released in 2012. He called his time making Spike Island "six weeks of pure bliss."

Shooting for Socrates is a 2014 football drama telling "the underdog story of a Northern Ireland team who kick off their world cup against football giants Brazil. The game is a baptism of fire for [Mirallegro's] character, David Campbell, who makes his Northern Ireland debut in front of 50,000 people the day before his 21st birthday". The film's cast was recognized as talented, but reviews of the script were less positive. (Note: "Shooting for Socrates is a "narrative that . . . sells its talented cast short – and that's not merely troublesome. It's fatal. . . . Fine actor though John Hannah is, his Billy Bingham is a blank slate with the wrong accent, and Nico Mirallegro fares little better, despite his best efforts.")

=== Stage ===
In January 2014, Mirallegro appeared at London's Royal Court Theatre in the drama The Pass, in which Russell Tovey plays a football player coming to terms with his homosexuality. Mirallegro reprised his comic role as a hotel bellboy in an "irrepressible performance" in a 2016 film adaptation of the work, which premiered at the BFI Flare: London LGBT Film Festival.

In November 2025 he made his directorial debut with My Name is Sandra, by Andrea Orton at The Kings Arms theatre in Salford.

=== Radio ===
Since 2014, Mirallegro has performed in several BBC Radio 4 dramas, including playing the eponymous male character in Orpheus and Eurydice. For this role, he was nominated for Best Actor at the BBC Audio Drama Awards in 2016. He was later cast as the protagonist in 79 Birthdays (2016) and as the son in Over Here, Over There (2016). The latter is a radio drama inspired by the plight of asylum seekers in the UK.

== Charity work ==
Mirallegro plays in celebrity football matches for charities such as Help For Heroes and Once Upon a Smile.

== Personal life ==
Mirallegro is a supporter of Manchester United FC.

== Filmography ==
=== Film ===
Year	Title	Role	Notes
2010	Six Minutes of Freedom	Chris	Short film
2011	Wheels of Fortune	Ben	Short film
2012	Spike Island	Dodge	
2014	Anita B.	David	
2014	Cold Comfort	Paul	Short film
2014	Shooting for Socrates	David Campbell	
2014	A Gun	Durwin	Short film
2016	The Pass	Harry	
2016	Cardboard Boy	Mark	Short film
2016	The Habit of Beauty	Ian	
2017	Murdered for Being Different	Rob Maltby	
2017	Come Out of the Woods	Michael	Short film
2018	Peterloo	John Bagguley	
2020	Re-displacement	Leo	Short film

Key
†	Denotes works that have not yet been released

=== Television ===
Year	Title	Role	Network	Notes
2007–2010	Hollyoaks	Barry "Newt" Newton	Channel 4	Nominated – The British Soap Awards Best Newcomer; Nominated – The British Soap Awards Best On-Screen Partnership (shared with Marc Silcock)
2010	Doctors	Giovanni Mannasori	BBC One	7 episodes
2010	Moving On	Jamie	BBC One	Episode: "Losing My Religion"
2010–2012	Upstairs Downstairs	Johnny Proude	BBC One	
2011	Exile	Teenage Tom	BBC One	
2011	The Body Farm	Sam Villiers	BBC One	Episode 1.2
2012	Last Tango in Halifax	Young Alan	BBC One	Episode 1.6
2013	The Village	Joe Middleton	BBC One	Series 1 Nominated – British Academy Television Awards for Best Supporting Actor
2013–2015	My Mad Fat Diary	Finn Nelson	E4	Series 1–3
2014	Common	Johnjo O'Shea	BBC One	
2015	The Ark	Kenan	BBC One	
2015	Virtuoso	Franz	HBO	
2016	Rillington Place	Timothy Evans	BBC One	3-part drama
2020	Penance	Jed Cousins	Channel 5	3-part drama
2020	Our Girl	"Prof"	BBC One	Season 4
2021	Moving On	Ben Keane	BBC One	Episode: "Wedding Day"
2021	The Beast Must Die	Nicky Toone	BritBox	3 episodes
2022	We Hunt Together	Rober (Bob) Miller	Alibi	Recurring
2022	Ridley	Callaghan Flannery	ITV	Episode 4
2023	Spy/Master	John Miller	Max	4 episodes
2024	Passenger	Kane Jackson	ITV	
2024	Stags	Stu	Paramount+	6 episodes

=== Stage ===
Year	Title	Role	Venue	Notes
2014	The Pass	Harry	Royal Court Theatre, London	Role reprised in 2016 film adaptation

=== Music videos ===
Year	Title	Role
2014	The Charlatans – "Talking in Tones"	Young Tim Burgess
2014	Tiny Ruins – "Carriages"	Stag

=== Radio ===
Year	Title	Role	Notes
2014	My Dad Keith	Young Jeff	Written by Maxine Peake
2015	Orpheus and Eurydice	Orpheus	Nominated – BBC Audio Drama Awards for Best Actor
2016	79 Birthdays	Jimmy	
2016	Over Here, Over There	Son	
2016	Innocence		

=== Web series ===
Year	Title	Role	Notes
2008–2010	LOL	Cam Spencer	

=== Audio books ===
Year	Title	Role	Notes
2015	Nothing but Shadows	Narrator	
2022	Space Band	Narrator	
2023	Vulnerable Voices	Narrator	

== Awards and nominations ==
Year	Award	Category	Work	Result	Ref.
2008	The British Soap Awards	Best Newcomer	Hollyoaks	Barry "Newt" Newton	Nominated
2009	The British Soap Awards	Best On-Screen Partnership (shared with Marc Silcock)	Hollyoaks	Barry "Newt" Newton	Nominated
2014	British Academy Television Awards	Best Supporting Actor	The Village	Joe Middleton	Nominated
2016	BBC Audio Drama Awards	Best Actor	Orpheus and Eurydice	Orpheus	Nominated
