= Man in an Orange Shirt =

British television movie

- Written by: Patrick Gale
- Directed by: Michael Samuels
- Starring: Julian Morris; Vanessa Redgrave; Oliver Jackson-Cohen; Joanna Vanderham; James McArdle; David Gyasi
- Composer: Dan Jones
- Country of origin: United Kingdom
- No. of episodes: 2

Production
- Running time: 110 minutes
- Production company: BBC

Original release
- Network: BBC One
- Release: 31 July 2017

Man in an Orange Shirt is a two-part British television movie from the BBC. It was produced by Kudos Film and Television and premiered on 31 July 2017 at BBC One. The film drama tells three love stories from two generations of a family, in the 1940s and in 2017.

Vanessa Redgrave, Julian Morris, and Oliver Jackson-Cohen act in the lead roles, directed by Michael Samuels. The script and idea come from the British best-selling-author Patrick Gale, whose family history is the autobiographical core of the plot. The film won 2018 International Emmy Award for Best TV Movie or Miniseries.

== Plot ==
Man in an Orange Shirt features two separate yet interwoven stories: Part 1 tells of the obstacles that Western society has put before the relationship of the two veterans, Michael and Thomas, in the immediate post-war period. Part 2 describes the trials and tribulations of 21st century partnerships, using the example of Michael's grandson Adam. The stories are linked by Flora, as Michael's grieving wife and Adam's grandmother, whose unrequited love for Michael and conservative education results in a hateful response to Adam's coming-out.

=== Part 1 ===
In modern London, a grandmother looks at an old photo of her deceased husband and remembers the beginning of their relationship in the turmoil of World War II. In the 1940s, young Flora Talbot is a London teacher whose fiancé, Michael Berryman, is captain in the British Army, stationed in Italy. During a mission, Michael is reunited with an old schoolmate, Captain Thomas March, who is badly wounded in the attack. Michael is close as Thomas convalesces, and before Thomas returns to England, the men share a kiss. Thomas makes Michael promise to seek him out in London after the war. Immediately upon his return, Michael visits Thomas before he even tells Flora he is back. Michael and Thomas spend a perfect weekend away from the rest of the world in the old manor cottage once owned by Michael's deceased parents. When their brief time together comes to an end, Michael tells a very upset Thomas of his intent to marry Flora. Thomas eventually agrees to be Michael's best man, and presents the couple with a painting of the cottage as a wedding gift.

Shortly before the birth of their son, Robert James, Flora finds a box of old love letters from Thomas in her husband's desk drawer. In a mixture of anger and fear over sexual laws, she burns the letters and confronts Michael, who is devastated by the loss of the letters. Flora begins birth contractions, and the midwife sends Michael out of the house. He wanders through the city and is tempted to cruise for sex in a public toilet. Instead, he takes flight, buys flowers and returns to Flora. After the birth of their child, the Berrymans never speak a word about the events again. Meanwhile, Thomas is arrested for cottaging, and sentenced to a full year in prison for gross indecency. Michael visits Thomas in prison, but Thomas refuses any further visits. Michael visits Thomas's mother, who shows him a backroom of his many paintings. She notes an unfinished painting of a man in an orange shirt, but even with the face unpainted, she recognises Michael as the subject. Knowing the connection between the men, she suggests that Michael could move with Thomas to a family house in France. Michael writes a final letter to Thomas in which he reveals all his feelings, but decides not to mail it. Thomas is released from prison, but leaves with his friends, as Michael looks on. A few years later, Thomas meets briefly with Michael in the presence of Flora and young son Robert, but their mutual feelings remain unspoken.

=== Part 2 ===
60 years later in 2017, widowed, elderly Flora's only grandchild, Adam, is a veterinarian. He frequently looks for new men to hook up with using a mobile app. After Flora bequeaths Adam his grandfather's old cottage, he hires architect Steve, who lives in an open relationship with the older Caspar. Despite Adam's fear of intimacy, he embarks on a slow love affair with Steve, who eventually tells Caspar he is leaving him for Adam. As Flora learns about the relationship and thus Adam's sexual orientation, the fear and rage that she had silenced against her husband breaks out.

When Adam and Steve find the cottage painting by Thomas during the clean-up, Flora reacts with mock ignorance, though it is inscribed to her and Michael with a wish that it someday hang in their home. In the picture frame, however, art connoisseur Caspar discovers another, hidden painting of Michael standing in the door of the cottage. This painting, the eponymous "Man in an Orange Shirt", is a finished version of the study Michael saw at Thomas's mother's house. At the sight of the hidden painting, Flora collapses, but finally tells Adam the whole story. Touched, Adam shares this information with Steve, but the two are driven apart again when Steve discovers Adam has re-downloaded his online dating app. Distraught, Adam seeks out Flora, who gives him a small box with some old photos and the never-sent letter from Michael to Thomas, which she had found only after Michael's death. Adam then shows Steve the letter, his feelings the same as his grandfather's many years ago, and the two reconcile.

== Background ==
The narrative is based in part on the family history of British best-selling author Patrick Gale; it was his screenplay debut. He wrote the story over six years. Like Flora Berryman, Gale's mother had found a stack of love letters from a male friend in her husband's desk shortly after the end of World War II. She also destroyed the letters, for fear that he might be arrested, and out of disgust and ignorance, as she had learned to equate homosexuality with paedophilia.

Filming locations included the London Charterhouse, where Downton Abbey, Agatha Christie's Poirot, Tulip Fever, Miss Austen Regrets and, since 2017, Taboo were also filmed. The wedding and department-store scenes in part one were partly filmed in Wandsworth town hall.

The drama was broadcast as the flagship of the BBC Gay Britannia season, a series of programs in 2017 commissioned to celebrate the fiftieth Anniversary of the Sexual Offences Act 1967: the 1967 Act which decriminalised homosexuality in England and Wales.

On 13 August 2017, TVNZ broadcast both parts as a coherent feature film. The US network PBS broadcast the two-piece in June 2018 as part of their anthology series Masterpiece.

== Cast ==
=== Main ===
- Julian Morris: Adam Berryman
- Vanessa Redgrave: older Flora Berryman
  - Joanna Vanderham: young Flora Talbot, later Flora Berryman
- Oliver Jackson-Cohen: Captain Michael Berryman
- James McArdle: Captain Thomas March
- David Gyasi: Steve, the architect

=== Supporting (part 1) ===
- Adrian Schiller: Lucien
- Laura Carmichael: Daphne Talbot
- James Godden: Private Begley
- Tommy Bastow: Private Bates
- Andrew Havill: Major Fanshawe
- Oliver Finnegan: Wykeham (painter)
- Ben Barker: Travis (painter)
- William Hoyland: Headmaster
- Arthur Bateman: Robert Berryman
- Paul Clayton: Registrar
- Ed White: Shopwalker
- Elizabeth Edmonds: Midwife
- Frances de la Tour: Mrs. March

=== Supporting (part 2) ===
- Julian Sands: Caspar Nicholson
- Angel Coulby: Claudie
- Amanda Rawnsley: Vet receptionist
- Drew Edwards: Sous chef
- Eddie Arnold: David
- Joanna David: Jennifer
- Eileen Page: Geraldine
- Hal Scardino: Dwight
- Phil Dunster: Bruno
- Gay Hamilton: Agnes
- Flaminia Cinque: Rita
- Mark Sears: Muscled man
- Warren Sollars: Grufff Bear
- Babajide Fado: Lorry driver

== Reception ==
Man in an Orange Shirt received positive reviews from critics and holds an 86% rating on Rotten Tomatoes.

The film won a 2018 International Emmy Award for Best TV Movie or Miniseries.

== See also ==
- If These Walls Could Talk 2, multi-period HBO TV film from March 2000
