= Andrew Sykes =

Professor of Sociology

Andrew J. M. Sykes was Professor of Sociology at the University of Strathclyde from 1967 to 1989. According to a biographical note: 'He received his doctorate in industrial sociology from Glasgow University. He taught Management Studies at Scottish College of Commerce for three years and then joined the staff at the University of Strathclyde in 1963. Professor Sykes has conducted research into social relations and attitude changes in printing, civil engineering, clerical employment, motor car assembling, social change in Ireland, industrial training and shipping.'

In 1974 Sykes was a member of a Study Group set up by the Institute for the Study of Conflict which published a report in February of that year titled 'Sources of conflict in British Industry'. Other members of the Study Group were Ken Watkins; Brian Crozier; Prof. A. R. Hersic of Bedford College, University of London and Prof. Raymond Thomas of the University of Bath. According to Richard Cockett 'the report claimed to be a comprehensive exposure of those politically motivated Trotskist of Communist-linked trade unionists within the trade union movement, who, under cover of legitimate industrial action, sought to create a revolutionary situation. the ISC thus drew some grave conclusions about the threat to democracy in Britain:

There can be no reasonable doubt that in several major British industries members of the Communist Party and other left wing organisations exert substantial influence in provoking and exacerbating conflict... Any serious study of the available evidence does more than indicate that a deliberate effort of considerable magnitude is being staged to disrupt industry for political ends; it shows that growing extremist organisations exist in some British Trade Unions capable of exerting influence wholly disproportionate to the numbers involved. It also shows that the aims of the extremist organisations are incompatible with any normally-accepted concepts of democracy in Britain.

As Cockett notes: 'Not surprisingly, given that this Report appeared at the time of the 1974 miners' strike, it attracted widespread publicity and the Observer, for instance, published Section 8 of the Report on 'Militant extremism and political subversion' in full.

== Patron of Alasdair Gray ==
Gray's most supportive patron was Andrew Sykes, first professor of sociology at Strathclyde University. He died in 1991, leaving some of Gray's paintings to Strathclyde's Collins Gallery and others to his friends, Greta and David Hodgkins of Nenagh, in Ireland. Gray is looking for three pictures - two were large black pen drawings on white paper of women: Mrs Nanni, a seminude wearing black stockings, and Marion Ogg, sprawled at length, reading, on a blue patterned rug. Gray is very anxious to track down a portrait drawing of Sykes seated in profile with his feet resting on his office desk, with what Gray describes as "a smile of calm superiority, somehow suggesting both a punchdrunk old boxer and a Roman imperial bust".

== Affiliations ==
- Institute for the Study of Conflict

== Publications ==
- Review: Industrial Relations: Contemporary Issues by B. C. Roberts, Review author[s]: A. J. M. Sykes The British Journal of Sociology, Vol. 21, No. 2 (Jun., 1970), pp. 238-239 doi:10.2307/588425 JSTOR 588425
- A. J. M. Sykes (1970) Myth in Communication Journal of Communication 20 (1), 17–31. doi:10.1111/j.1460-2466.1970.tb00861.x
- A. J. M. Sykes, Overtime, False Returns, and Restrictive Practices: The Perception of an Industrial Pay System Human Relations, Vol. 29, No. 11, 1083-1101 (1976) doi:10.1177/001872677602901106

== Notes ==
1. University of Strathclyde University of Strathclyde Calendar 2006-07 Part 1 Staff Lists and General Regulations
2. A. J. M. Sykes (1970) Myth in Communication Journal of Communication 20 (1), 17–31. doi:10.1111/j.1460-2466.1970.tb00861.x
3. Institute for the Study of Conflict, Sources of Conflict in British Industry, ISC, 1974, p. 26.
4. Richard Cockett, Thinking the Unthinkable, London: Harper Collins, 1994, p. 223-4.
5. Aideen McLaughlin 'Alasdair Gray pleads for help to find his long-lost artworks; Scots artist plans visual autobiography . . . if he can track down his paintings', The Sunday Herald, May 1, 2005, SECTION: NEWS; Pg. 3
