= Paul Forman (actor) =

English actor and model (born 1994)

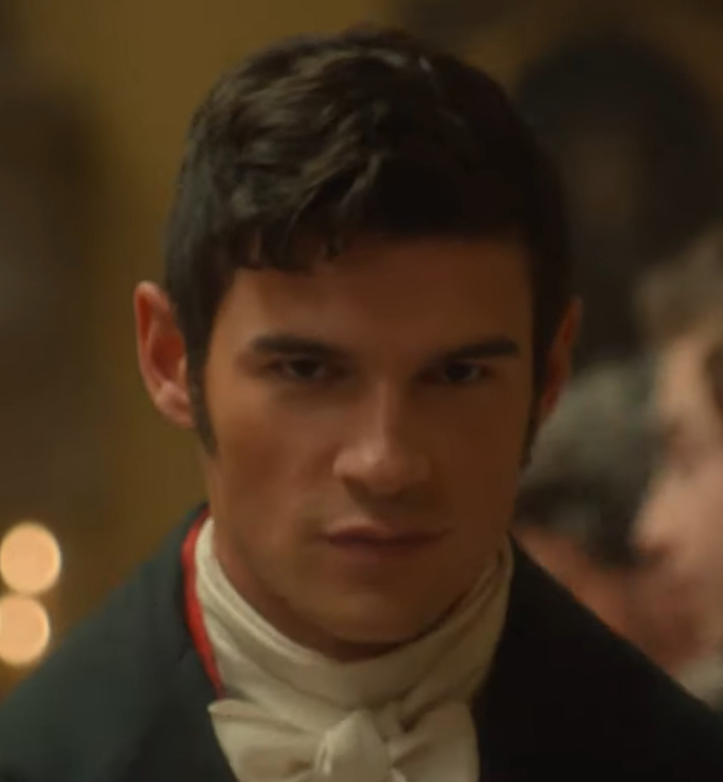
- Forman as Lord Barton in the Doctor Who episode "Rogue" (2024)
- Born: Paul-Emile Forman; 16 March 1994 (age 32)
- Education: Lycée Français Charles de Gaulle; Drama Studio London
- Occupations: Actor; model
- Years active: 2019–present

Paul Forman (born 16 March 1994) is an English and French actor and model. His films include Nevrland (2019). On television, he is known for his roles in the Amazon Prime series Riches (2022), the Netflix series Emily in Paris (2022–2025), and the Paramount+ series Stags (2024).

== Early life ==
Forman was born to a French mother and a British father and raised in London, where he attended the Lycée Français Charles de Gaulle in South Kensington. Forman has a degree in mathematics. It was during university at age 19 that he discovered acting through plays. He went on to complete a 2-year diploma in Professional Acting at the Drama Studio London in 2016.

== Career ==
Forman has appeared in the 2019 Austrian film Nevrland, the Starz series The Spanish Princess (2020), the Irish comedy series Frank of Ireland (2021), the Amazon Prime Video series Riches (2022), the Netflix series Emily in Paris (2022–2024), and the BBC series Father Brown (2023).

In November 2023, it was announced that he will make an appearance in the Paramount+ drama series Stags. On 23 April 2024, it was announced that Forman had been cast in the upcoming series of Doctor Who as Lord Barton.

== Personal life ==
In 2023, Forman began a relationship with Ashley Park. In October 2025, the couple broke up after two years.

== Filmography ==
=== Film ===
- Nevrland (2019), Kristjan
- Seagull (2019), Connor

=== Television ===
Year	Title	Role	Notes	Ref.
2020	The Spanish Princess	King Francis	2 episodes	
2021	Frank of Ireland	Stéphane	2 episodes	
2022	McDonald & Dodds	Marco Capone	Episode: "A Billion Beats"	
2022	Riches	Luke	5 episodes	
2022–2025	Emily in Paris	Nicolas de Léon	19 episodes	
2023	Father Brown	Gabriel Wadey	Episode: "The Beast of Wedlock"	
2024	Doctor Who	Lord Barton	Episode: "Rogue"	
2024	Stags	Hugo	4 episodes	
