= Emily in Paris =

American romantic comedy-drama TV series

- Genre: Romantic comedy; Comedy-drama
- Created by: Darren Star
- Showrunner: Darren Star
- Starring: Lily Collins; Philippine Leroy-Beaulieu; Ashley Park; Lucas Bravo; Samuel Arnold; Bruno Gouery; Camille Razat; William Abadie; Lucien Laviscount
- Theme music composer: James Newton Howard
- Composers: Chris Alan Lee; Gabriel Mann
- Country of origin: United States
- Original languages: English; French
- No. of seasons: 5
- No. of episodes: 50

Production
- Executive producers: Andrew Fleming; Tony Hernandez; Lilly Burns; Darren Star; Robin Schiff; Alison Brown; Grant Sloss; Joe Murphy; Stephen Joel Brown
- Production locations: Paris, Île-de-France, France
- Cinematography: Steven Fierberg; Alexander Gruszynski; Stéphane Bourgoin; Seamus Tierney; Jendra Jarnagin
- Editors: Alex Minnick; Laura Weinberg; Jesse Gordon; John Rafanelli; Brian Ray; Veronica Rutledge; Jon Higgins; Rachel Ambelang; Elizabeth Merrick; Dylan Eckman; Tomas F. Peralta
- Camera setup: Single-camera
- Running time: 24–46 minutes
- Production companies: Darren Star Productions; Jax Media; Paramount Television Studios (Note: Credited as MTV Studios for seasons 1 and MTV Entertainment Studios for seasons 2–4)

Original release
- Network: Netflix
- Release: October 2, 2020 – present

Emily in Paris (Note: According to Netflix, the title is pronounced with the French pronunciation of Paris "Pa-ree" so that the title has a rhyming sound. The series is titled Emily in Rome for the fifth season.) is an American romantic comedy drama television series created by Darren Star for Netflix. The series stars Lily Collins as aspiring marketing executive Emily Cooper, an American who moves to Paris to provide an American point of view to a French marketing firm. In Paris, she tries to overcome challenges in her work, love life, and friendships. The series also stars Philippine Leroy-Beaulieu, Ashley Park, Lucas Bravo, Samuel Arnold, Bruno Gouery, Camille Razat, William Abadie, and Lucien Laviscount.

Produced by MTV Studios and developed initially for Paramount Network, where it was given a straight-to-series order in September 2018, the series moved to Netflix in July 2020. Filming takes place in Île-de-France, mainly in Paris and its suburbs, and began in August 2019.

Emily in Paris premiered on October 2, 2020, to mixed reviews in the United States and criticism in France for negatively stereotyping Parisians and the French. In November 2020, the series was renewed for a second season by Netflix, which premiered on December 22, 2021. In January 2022, the series was renewed for a third and fourth season by Netflix. The third season premiered on December 21, 2022. The fourth season premiered in two parts: the first premiered on August 15, 2024, followed by the second on September 12, 2024. In September 2024, the series was renewed for a fifth season, which premiered on December 18, 2025. In January 2026, the series was renewed for a sixth and final season, which is slated to premiere on December 24, 2026.

== Premise ==
Emily in Paris follows Emily Cooper, an American from Chicago with a master's degree in communications, who moves to Paris for a new job opportunity. She is tasked with bringing an American point of view and social media presence to a venerable French marketing firm. Cultures clash as she adjusts to the challenges of life in Paris while juggling her career, new friendships, and active love life.

== Cast and characters ==
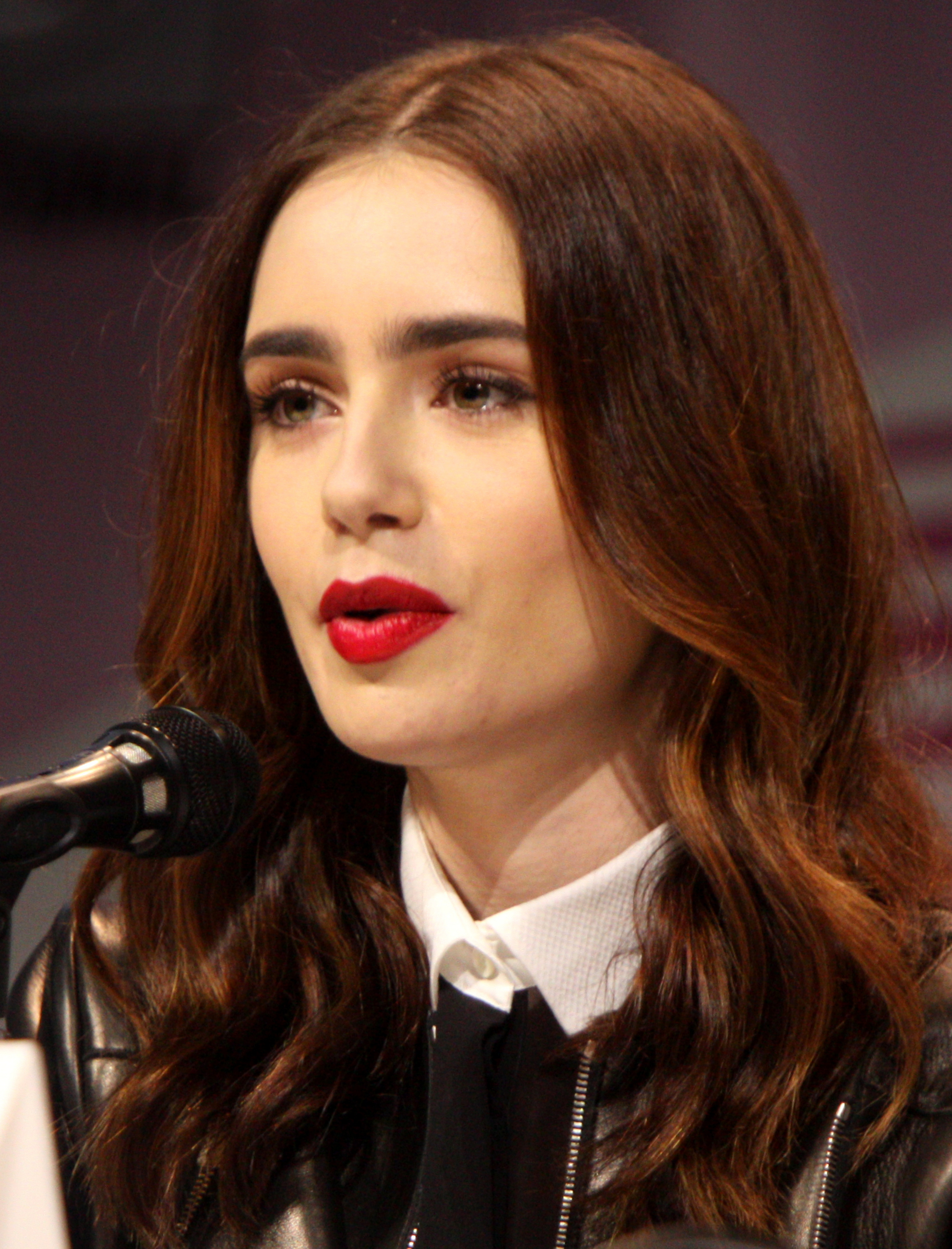
Lily Collins plays the title character Emily

=== Main ===
- Lily Collins as Emily Cooper, a 29-year-old who moves from Chicago to Paris for a temporary social media strategy job at Savoir
- Philippine Leroy-Beaulieu as Sylvie Grateau, Emily's tough and bitter boss at Savoir—later Agence Grateau—in Paris
- Ashley Park as Mindy Chen, Emily's first friend in Paris, an American nanny of Chinese-Korean descent and aspiring singer, and the heiress to a Shanghai business magnate from whom she is estranged
- Lucas Bravo as Gabriel, (Note: In season 5, Lucas Bravo is credited as a series regular in the episodes which he appears in.) Emily's attractive downstairs neighbor, the head chef at Chez Lavaux, Camille's former boyfriend and Emily's main 'will they, won't they' love interest throughout the seasons
- Samuel Arnold as Julien, Emily's trendy and theatrical co-worker who forms a comic duo with Luc
- Bruno Gouery as Luc, Emily's quirky co-worker, who forms a comic duo with Julien
- Camille Razat as Camille (seasons 1–4), (Note: Camille Razat is credited as a series regular from the fourth episode of the first season through the ninth episode of the fourth season. She does not appear and is not credited in the seventh episode of the second season, and the seventh and eighth episodes of the third season.) Emily's friend, and Gabriel's former girlfriend who works at an art gallery and is a champagne heiress. Her family, part of the French nobility, owns a château and vineyard.
- William Abadie as Antoine Lambert (season 2–present; recurring season 1), (Note: William Abadie is credited as a series regular in the episodes which he appears in.) Emily's client who owns the perfume company Maison Lavaux and is having a long-standing affair with Sylvie
- Lucien Laviscount as Alfie (seasons 3 and 5; recurring seasons 2 and 4), (Note: Lucien Laviscount is credited as a series regular in the episodes which he appears in.) a British banker in Emily's French class and one of Emily's love interest

=== Recurring ===
- Kate Walsh as Madeline (seasons 1–3), Emily's boss in Chicago who cannot take the job in Paris after learning that she is pregnant
- Jean-Christophe Bouvet as Pierre Cadault (seasons 1–3, guest season 5), a famous flamboyant French designer and uncle of Mathieu
- Charles Martins as Mathieu Cadault (seasons 1–2), a businessman who becomes Emily's love interest
- Jeremy O. Harris as Grégory Elliot Duprée (season 2–3, guest season 4), Pierre Cadault's rival
- Céline Menville as Jacqueline (seasons 2–3; guest season 1), Emily's French teacher
- Arnaud Binard as Laurent Grateau, (season 2–present), Sylvie's husband
- Kevin Dias as Benoît (seasons 2–4), a member of Mindy's band and her love interest
- Jin Xuan Mao as Étienne (seasons 2–4), a member of Mindy's band
- Søren Bregendal as Erik de Groot (seasons 2–3), a photographer and Sylvie's love interest
- Melia Kreiling as Sofia Sideris (season 3–4), a Greek artist who works with Camille and with whom she is having an affair
- Paul Forman as Nicolas de Léon (seasons 3–present), a businessman and Mindy's love interest, with whom she attended a boarding school and Marcello's friend
- Pierre Deny as Louis de Léon (season 3-4), CEO of the fictional fashion company JVMA and father of Nicolas de Leon
- Eugenio Franceschini as Marcello (season 4–5), Emily's love interest whom she met in Megève and Nicolas's friend
- Thalia Besson as Geneviève (season 4–5), Laurent G.'s daughter from New York who is interested in Gabriel romantically
- Raoul Bova as Giancarlo (season 4–5), an Italian commercial director and Sylvie's former film professor and old flame
- Anna Galiena as Antonia Muratori (season 4–5), Marcello's mother
- Minnie Driver as Princess Jane (season 5), an old friend of Sylvie who is married into an Italian royal family

=== Guest ===
- Roe Hartrampf as Doug (seasons 1 and 3), Emily's ex-boyfriend in Chicago
- Charley Fouquet as Catherine Lambert (seasons 1–3), Antoine's wife
- Camille Japy as Louise (seasons 1–4), Camille's aristocratic mother
- Christophe Guybet as Gerard (seasons 1–4), Camille's father
- Victor Meutelet as Timothée (seasons 1–4), Camille's younger brother with whom Emily has a one-night stand
- Hanaé Cloarec-Bailly and Tytouan Cloarec-Bailly as Sybil and Laurent Dupont (season 1), the two children that Mindy nannies
- Arnaud Viard as Paul Brossard (season 1), the owner of Savoir
- Claude Perron as Patricia (season 1), an employee at Savoir
- Eion Bailey as Randy Zimmer (season 1), a well-known hotel owner
- Aleksandra Yermak as Klara (season 1), the representative of Hästens, a Swedish luxury bedmaker
- Julien Floreancig as Thomas (season 1), a snobbish French professor of semiotics
- Carlson Young as Brooklyn Clark (season 1), a famous young American actress
- Elizabeth Tan as Li (seasons 1 and 4), Mindy's best friend who brings her bridesmaids to Paris to shop for bridesmaids' dresses
- David Prat as Théo (season 1), the elder of Camille's two brothers
- Alexandrina Turcan as Jovanka (season 1), a Serbian model who starred in a perfume commercial for De L'Heure
- Faith Prince as Judith Robertson (season 1), the head of the American Friends of the Louvre
- Isaiah Hodges and Christophe Tek as Grey Space (season 1), a duo of avant-garde designers
- Daria Panchenko as Petra (season 2), a woman in Emily's French class
- Ellen von Unwerth as herself (season 2), a photographer hired for Pierre Cadault's photoshoot
- Julien Looman as Gerhard (season 2), Ellen von Unwerth's agent and Julien's potential love interest
- Alice Révérend as Natalie (season 2), a bartender at Chez Lavaux
- Luca Ivoula as Raphael (season 2), a sous-chef at Gabriel's restaurant
- Brigitte Macron as herself (season 4)
- Debi Mazar as Marlena (season 4)
- Rupert Everett as Giorgio Barbieri (season 4), an Italian fashion designer
- Michèle Laroque as Yvette (season 5), another old friend of Sylvie
- Bryan Greenberg as Jake Campbell (season 5), a consular officer at the U.S. Embassy in Paris
- Jonathan Cake as Thomas Heatherton (season 5), a British billionaire and client of Agence Grateau.

== Episodes ==
Season	Episodes		Originally released
1	10		October 2, 2020
2	10		December 22, 2021
3	10		December 21, 2022
4	10	5	August 15, 2024
4	10	5	September 12, 2024
5	10		December 18, 2025
6	10		December 24, 2026

=== Season 1 (2020) ===
No. overall	No. in season	Title	Directed by	Written by	Original release date
1	1	"Emily in Paris"	Andrew Fleming	Darren Star	October 2, 2020
Emily Cooper's boss Madeline prepares to transition from the Chicago-based pharmaceutical marketing firm, the Gilbert Group, to a French fashion firm, Savoir, when she discovers she is pregnant. The Gilbert Group offers the job to Emily, who accepts, leaving her boyfriend back in Chicago. Emily moves to Paris even though she does not speak French. She changes her Instagram handle from @emilycooper to @emilyinparis and begins documenting her time in Paris. Emily starts her first day of work much to the chagrin of her new co-workers, who reveal that she was only hired because of a business deal. She introduces the French, who seem reluctant about her and her American methods, to American social media strategies. Emily accidentally tries to enter the wrong apartment and meets her neighbor Gabriel. As Emily becomes accustomed to life in Paris, she makes countless faux-pas, and her colleagues nickname her "la plouc" or "the hick". Emily meets Mindy Chen, a nanny from Shanghai, and they become fast friends. After Emily and her boyfriend attempt to have cybersex and the connection fails, she plugs in her vibrator and accidentally short-circuits the block's power.
2	2	"Masculin Féminin"	Andrew Fleming	Darren Star	October 2, 2020
Despite struggling to fit in with French office culture, Emily convinces her boss, Sylvie, to invite her to a work party where she accidentally irritates Sylvie by conversing with Antoine Lambert, a client who turns out to be Sylvie's married lover. As punishment, she is put to work marketing Vaga-Jeune, a lubricant for menopausal women. Annoyed with the gendered nature of the French language, Emily writes a post about the product, which goes viral, causing her to make further inroads at work. Emily's boyfriend tells her that she should return to Chicago as he struggles with a long-distance relationship, and he does not want to visit Paris despite it being a pre-planned trip. She refuses to return to Chicago and breaks off the relationship. She turns to Mindy for emotional support.
3	3	"Sexy or Sexist"	Andrew Fleming	Darren Star	October 2, 2020
Emily is invited to the shoot for De l'Heure's latest commercial to take behind-the-scenes footage for social media and is shocked to discover the commercial involves a model strutting nude down the Pont Alexandre III while suited men ogle at her. She argues with Antoine that the ad is sexist while he counters that it is sexy, leading Emily to suggest an online marketing campaign that asks the perfume's customers what they think. When the campaign goes viral, Antoine sends Emily La Perla lingerie as a thank-you gift. Mindy proposes a dinner party to help Emily meet new people, but the party turns into a rager. She meets a French man, and they hit it off, but Emily returns to Gabriel's restaurant for comfort after the man offends her.
4	4	"A Kiss Is Just a Kiss"	Zoe Cassavetes	Kayla Alpert	October 2, 2020
While struggling to communicate at a flower shop, Emily is rescued by Camille, a friendly French stranger, and gallery owner who proves to be a lucrative connection. When Emily discovers Sylvie and Antoine arguing at work, she tries to boost Sylvie's credibility at work by pretending that she came up with an idea to pair Antoine's perfumes with luxury hotels. After a miscommunication that renders her work dinner reservation at an exclusive, luxurious restaurant invalid, Emily convinces Gabriel to host them at his restaurant instead. As a gesture of thanks for his help, Emily kisses him, and he kisses her back. Leaving the restaurant, Emily bumps into Camille again, who reveals that Gabriel is her boyfriend.
5	5	"Faux Amis"	Zoe Cassavetes	Ali Waller and Joe Murphy	October 2, 2020
With over 20,000 followers on her Instagram account, Emily is invited to Durée Cosmetics' Influencer Lunch, where her posts about the brand's products attract the attention of Durée CMO Olivia Thompson. Emily, however, fails to convince Olivia to have Savoir represent their company again, with Sylvie cited as the reason. Camille invites Emily to a night out with her and Gabriel. When alone with Gabriel, Emily asks that he forget about their kiss the night before, to which he agrees. But later on, he admits that he, too, feels chemistry with her. Initially outraged at seeing Emily's Instagram posts for Durée, Sylvie demands that she delete her account. Still, when a client becomes inspired by one of Emily's posts, Sylvie begrudgingly allows Emily to keep her account and leverage her "influencer" status.
6	6	"Ringarde"	Andrew Fleming	Matt Whitaker	October 2, 2020
Emily joins Sylvie and Julien to visit the atelier of haute couturier Pierre Cadault. Pierre is mortified by the gauche charm on Emily's handbag and calls her a "basic bitch" in French, which hinders her credibility in the firm. At Café de Flore, Emily meets French philosophy professor Thomas. They hit it off, and she invites him back to her apartment, where they have sex. Emily and Thomas encounter Gabriel and Camille, and Camille invites them to join them at a tapas restaurant. Thomas and Gabriel do not get along. The next day, Gabriel tells Emily he thinks Thomas is a snob and not worthy of her. Emily discovers Pierre has designed the costumes for Swan Lake, so she invites Thomas to join her. However, he insults her by telling her Swan Lake is a ballet for tourists. Emily realizes that he is a snob, so she leaves him. She sees Pierre at the ballet and walks into his private box to talk to him so he will remain with Savoir.
7	7	"French Ending"	Andrew Fleming	Emily Goldwyn and Sarah Choi	October 2, 2020
Because Emily's ride-share car fails to arrive, Gabriel rescues her by obtaining a moped to take her to the club where Brooklyn, an American actress, is partying. They find Brooklyn intoxicated, and she ditches them again. Emily and Gabriel go to the Hôtel Plaza Athénée where Brooklyn stays, but the front desk clerk is uncooperative and won't divulge Brooklyn's room number. Sylvie arrives and threatens the clerk with scandal and possible damage to the hotel's reputation should the famous actress be harmed. He reluctantly takes them to the room and opens the door.
8	8	"Family Affair"	Andrew Fleming	Grant Sloss	October 2, 2020
Camille invites Emily to lunch and asks if Savoir could take on her family's champagne vineyard as a client. Mindy's friend and five bridesmaids are in Paris for wedding dress shopping. Camille invites Emily to meet her family at their chateau. Gabriel surprises Emily by joining them for the weekend trip, which makes Emily uncomfortable. Emily tours the winery and meets Camille's younger brother Timothée. Gabriel refuses Camille's mother's business loan offer. At a club where Mindy's girlfriends are partying, they force her on stage to sing the song she flubbed on Chinese Popstar. Back at the chateau, Camille and her mother are arguing, so Emily takes refuge by the pool, where Timothée joins her. They drink champagne and eventually have sex. At breakfast, she learns Timothée is not the brother Camille was referring to. Instead, it was her younger, 17-year-old brother. Emily meets Théo, Camille's older and more age-appropriate brother. Emily finally gets an opportunity to pitch her idea to Camille's mother.
9	9	"An American Auction in Paris"	Peter Lauer	Alison Brown	October 2, 2020
Sylvie is unimpressed with Emily's idea to market Camille's family's champagne. Emily meets Judith Robertson, a member of the American Friends of the Louvre (AFL). She is aware of Emily's association with Pierre Cadault and asks if Pierre might be willing to donate a dress to be auctioned at AFL's fundraising benefit. Emily calls Mathieu Cadault to arrange a meeting to ask about the dress donation. They agree to meet at an art opening at Camille's gallery. Sylvie and Luc also arrive at the opening to meet Camille. At the AFL auction, Grey Space, which consists of two avant-garde fashion designers, shows up and bids for Pierre's dress. As Emily models the dress on stage, Grey Space shoots her with paint as a publicity stunt which shocks the audience. The next day, the stunt is featured in all the newspapers and online. Pierre is sad and takes to his bed. Emily visits him to try to positively spin the incident but to no avail. As she leaves Pierre's home, she runs into Mathieu, who makes a pass at her.
10	10	"Cancel Couture"	Peter Lauer	Grant Sloss	October 2, 2020
Mathieu and Emily go on a date, but are interrupted by Pierre, who calls threatening to cancel his fashion show. Pierre is holed up in his atelier on the verge of a breakdown and will not show his new collection to anyone. Sylvie blames Emily for shaking his confidence and fires her. The next day, Pierre requests to see Emily. Sylvie goes with her to see Pierre. At the atelier, they see a dress from Pierre's new collection. In need of a venue to launch his fashion show, Pierre hijacks the outside of his former venue to show his new collection, which is well-received and makes him the toast of Fashion Week. To celebrate, Emily hosts a dinner at Gabriel's restaurant for Mathieu and Pierre. Mindy agrees to emcee and sings at a drag bar two nights a week. However, her employers fire her for this, so she moves in with Emily. To pursue his dream of opening his restaurant, Gabriel decides to move back to Normandy. Realizing that this may be Gabriel's last night in Paris, Emily and Gabriel have sex. However, Antoine later decides to invest in his restaurant idea, thus keeping Gabriel in Paris.

=== Season 2 (2021) ===
No. overall	No. in season	Title	Directed by	Written by	Original release date
11	1	"Voulez-Vous Coucher Avec Moi?"	Andrew Fleming	Darren Star	December 22, 2021
Emily is confused after her affair with Gabriel and her friendship with his now ex-girlfriend Camille. Even worse, Emily has a weekend getaway planned for St Tropez with Mathieu. The ad account for Champere, Camille's family's champagne brand, goes to Luc even though Emily believes she brought the new business to Savoir. Camille shows up to discuss the marketing campaign, though she, Sylvie, and Emily go to lunch instead. Camille teams up with Emily for a night out at the drag bar they previously visited, where Emily's new roommate Mindy performs a solo version of BTS's "Dynamite". When Emily breaks away for her romantic weekend in St Tropez, Mathieu overhears her cell phone conversation with Gabriel about their sleeping together, which upsets him. As he leaves her on the train departing Paris, he gives Emily the tickets for a romantic weekend with Gabriel, who he says she should invite for the romantic weekend they had originally planned for themselves.
12	2	"Do You Know the Way to St. Tropez?"	Andrew Fleming	Grant Sloss	December 22, 2021
Emily ends up staying at the Four Seasons Hotel in St Tropez and calls Camille and Mindy to join her. Emily meets a famous fashion journalist who claims to know M. Cadault, and offers to model promotional marketing fashion shots with Emily's new luggage, which features a lifesize likeness of Cadault etched onto its surface. Upon seeing these pictures, the Instagram response upsets Cadault, and Mathieu asks Emily to remove them. While going out with Camille and Mindy, Emily receives a call from Gabriel. Camille refuses to take the call, and Emily says she will call him later. Later in the evening, Emily discovers that Sylvie has come to St Tropez and is married to Laurent, a restaurant manager at the hotel. The next morning, Camille calls Emily to pick her up at a church. Camille's evening plans for a tryst with a stranger went badly, and she still has feelings for Gabriel. Emily and her friends walk on the pier and find the journalist on his yacht. Emily gets him to invite them on board as his apology for lying about Cadault. The girls relax on the yacht's lounge chairs.
13	3	"Bon Anniversaire!"	Andrew Fleming	Alison Brown	December 22, 2021
Camille takes Emily to a Moroccan bath house to meet her friends for a nude steam bath. All the girls are nude except Emily, who insists on wearing a full-length cotton robe for modesty. Later, Emily and Mindy make plans for Emily's birthday, inviting Camille and Gabriel to attend, where Emily hopes they will reconcile. The planning takes all day; the evening eventually comes off, with Gabriel helping Emily with the dinner preparations. During the outdoor evening dinner party, everything goes well. Camille returns to Emily's apartment for more champagne from Emily's fridge. When she gets the champagne, she discovers that Gabriel's favorite frying pan (with his engraved initials on it) is on Emily's stove, and she concludes that for a chef to make a gift of his favorite pan to a girl can only have the worst implications for Camille's future with Gabriel. She returns to the evening party and says she has a toast that everyone eagerly waits for. Camille denounces Emily as a turncoat for having an affair with their boyfriend, which Emily finds that she cannot deny.
14	4	"Jules and Em"	Peter Lauer	Joe Murphy	December 22, 2021
Emily returns the frying pan and gives her presentation about Champere to Camille, who is still upset about Emily sleeping with Gabriel. Camille insists that the presentation must be in French, and Emily's inability to speak it requires Luc to take over. Emily meets a tourist from Kyiv in her French class. She is then assigned to take a new account to promote leeks. Returning home, she bumps into Gabriel, who says he has a terrific recipe for leeks and makes it for her. Emily goes shopping with the tourist, who becomes a shoplifter. Gabriel finds Camille at an art gallery opening and says that he wants to patch things up. Luc invites Emily to see Jules and Jim to help improve her French, but Emily does not connect with the ménage à trois. Emily tries to write a letter in French to Camille to reconcile their differences using a machine translator, which works poorly. Camille does not understand what the letter says and remains angry at Emily. The leek farmers ad campaign goes in a new direction—targeting America's dietary health drinks market. At her next class, Emily introduces herself to a young bank executive from London.
15	5	"An Englishman in Paris"	Katina Medina Mora	Sarah Choi	December 22, 2021
Gabriel makes his restaurant debut. Emily is given the responsibility of coming up with the music for the Choppard Happy Hearts Party. Emily is paired up with Alfie, a London-born classmate who is bored. Emily meets up with Alfie at a restaurant that is hardly related to French culture. Camille meets Emily at the Eiffel Tower and vows for both of them not to make a pact with Gabriel. Emily and Alfie meet up again on a boat, and Emily gets bored of his anti-French attitude. Emily sees Gabriel again and reminds him that she is only in Paris for a year.
16	6	"Boiling Point"	Katina Medina Mora	Alison Brown	December 22, 2021
Gabriel's restaurant opens. Vespa is added as new client for Savoir and wants Ellen von Unwerth to shoot a commercial for them. Gabriel quits on opening night of Chez Levaux. Emily suggests keeping it a restaurant until 11:00 p.m., then turning it into a nightclub afterwards. Sylvie says a photographer named Erik DeGroot was hired for the Vespa photoshoot, to which Julien objects. The Vespa arrives, and Emily takes off on it. She finds Alfie, and they both ride to French class.
17	7	"The Cook, the Thief, Her Ghost, and His Lover"	Jennifer Arnold	Joe Murphy	December 22, 2021
Emily wakes up to a boiling hot summer day. Gabriel explains to Emily why Chez Levaux has a new menu every day. Madaline announces Palotech's International Roll-Out coming to France. Emily is complimented on finally getting the French language down by her teacher. Alfie invites Emily over to her apartment. Gabriel invites Emily to come to Marche Bastille at 7:00 p.m. Pelotech is pitched to Savoir. Emily fumes over Alfie not responding to her texts and thinks he ghosted her. She eventually confronts him, and Alfie reveals that it was because he lost his phone, because it was in the oversized suit jacket that she took.
18	8	"Champagne Problems"	Jennifer Arnold	Darren Star	December 22, 2021
Emily returns to the Champère account and pitches a new campaign. Camille says that her father wants to be the face of the brand. She then offers Emily to come with her to the Chateau this weekend. Emily finds Alfie at Chez Levaux. Camille finds out that Emily is somewhat dating Alfie. The campaign takes an unexpected turn for the worse when Gerard cuts off the tip of his finger while trying to open the Champagne bottle. Gabriel comes to the Chateau after being notified about the accident.
19	9	"Scents & Sensibility"	Andrew Fleming	Sarah Choi	December 22, 2021
Emily insists to Camille that her relationship with Alfie is just having fun and nothing serious. Madeleine announces to Emily that she is coming to Paris. Mindy's secret as the daughter of one of the richest families in China puts her relationship with Benoit in jeopardy. Madeline looks into the business accounts of Savoir, and it puts Sylvie right over the edge. Madeline finds out from Catherine that Antoine had been having an affair with Sylvie for over three years.
20	10	"French Revolution"	Andrew Fleming	Grant Sloss	December 22, 2021
Madeline tells Emily that Savoir may need to make personnel changes. Mindy makes up with Benoit. Emily announces that the Laboratorie Lavaux launch was a success, and the company would be opening another DIY experience in the south. Gregory is shown having a meltdown that leads to his firing. Julien takes Emily to the iconic gay bar Le Raidd, in the historic gay district of Paris, to meet Gregory. A fashion show ends up being held at Versailles. Emily praises Gregory and Pierre for the show after it is over. Pierre then announces that he is firing Savoir, and Sylvie announces that she and her team are quitting, surprising Emily. Emily meets up with Madeline about the idea of returning to Chicago, and she suddenly gets a text from Sylvie. During this meeting, she is informed that Sylvie's husband bought her shares from his club, and the money is being used to start a new firm, with both Pierre and Gregory on board. They want Emily to join and stay in Paris longer than planned. After some contemplating with Mindy and Gabriel, she decides to stay in Paris for what could be indefinitely. During this time, Emily finds out that Gabriel asked Camille to move in and be back together.

=== Season 3 (2022) ===
No. overall	No. in season	Title	Directed by	Written by	Original release date
21	1	"I Have Two Lovers"	Andrew Fleming	Grant Sloss	December 21, 2022
Emily dreams of standing at the Eiffel Tower and discussing her dilemma regarding deciding whether to work for both Madeline and Sylvie. When she wakes up, it turns out that she is working for both of them; Emily feels that she cannot quit as it would entail telling a pregnant Madeline that she would prefer to work for Sylvie. Madeline learns the truth from Luc, and later that evening, she interrupts a business dinner at the Eiffel Tower, where Sylvie's new company is making a pitch to a prospective client, who is one of Emily's contacts. Madeline's water breaks, and she is taken to the hospital in an ambulance. Sylvie fires Emily, who arrives late to the farewell party she planned for Alfie. After seeing her hesitation about their relationship, Alfie says goodbye and gets in a cab, leaving Emily alone.
22	2	"What's It All About..."	Andrew Fleming	Alison Brown	December 21, 2022
Madeline gives birth to a baby boy named Jack, and Emily tries to prove her loyalty. They meet with one of Savoir's clients, but Sylvie also arrives. Madeline tells them that they cannot take Savoir's clients due to a non-compete clause in their contracts, putting Sylvie's new company in jeopardy, as that means their only remaining client would be Pierre Cadault. Emily finds out that Alfie is now working for Antoine as his new CFO but chooses not to tell her. Emily and Luc convince Madeline to rehire Sylvie as Savoir's president. Sylvie refuses, only to immediately discover that she has no clients, as Pierre Cadault has sold his company to the luxury conglomerate JVMA, which handles their marketing in-house. Later, JVMA contacts Sylvie, offering her a position with the company, which includes allowing her to bring along her staff, but she declines after discussing it with Luc and Julien. It is Solstice Night in Paris, and Emily takes Mindy's microphone and sings to Alfie to show how much she cares about him, leading to a reconciliation between the two.
23	3	"Coo D'état"	Andrew Fleming	Joe Murphy	December 21, 2022
Sylvie is threatened with eviction by her landlord as she has been using her apartment as an office. With Luc's help, she speaks with the building manager of the Savoir building to force Madeline and Emily to leave. Mindy feels nervous about performing in a club and discovers that having sex with Benoit helps. Camille and Gabriel have been encountering issues since she moved in, and with Alfie's help, they share a romantic dinner at the restaurant. After the elevator and heat in the Savoir building are sabotaged, Madeline tells Emily that the Gilbert Group has approved them to leave the building and work at her hotel. The following day, Emily discovers that Madeline plans to return to Chicago and has also bought a plane ticket for her. Emily tells Madeline she wishes to stay in Paris and resigns from her position. The episode ends with Sylvie and her team returning to their old building and establishing a new company named Grateau, and Emily walking out of Madeline's hotel after saying goodbye.
24	4	"Live from Paris, It's Emily Cooper"	Erin Ehrlich	Sarah Choi	December 21, 2022
After becoming unemployed, Emily starts vlogging around Paris, needing to stay busy. Meanwhile, she is hired temporarily as a waitress at Gabriel's restaurant. Still, after she accidentally causes a client to have an allergic reaction due to her limited (but improved) French, she is fired by Gabriel, making her realize that it is not the right situation for her. Luc and Julien tell Sylvie they used Emily's ideas for a customer, making her uncomfortable. However, after speaking with Camille's mother, she feels encouraged to seek out and rehire Emily. Camille feels guilty for not respecting her pact with Emily, and an artist called Sofia at the art gallery shows romantic interest in her.
25	5	"Ooo La La Liste"	Erin Ehrlich	Robin Schiff	December 21, 2022
Emily is dealing with her work visa application as she fears being deported and does her best to promote Grateau. Alfie gets a new apartment and has a housewarming party, where Emily sees Camille kissing Sofia on the rooftop. Nicholas from JVMA and Mindy see each other, and they turn out to be old boarding schoolmates, making Benoit jealous as Nicholas is interested in Mindy. Emily shares what she saw on the rooftop with Mindy, but Mindy suggests she should not get involved, as she was previously blamed for the breakup between Camille and Gabriel. Mindy is about to perform with Benoit for the first time when she receives flowers from Nicholas, causing Benoit to break up with her. Emily appears on La Liste, along with Gabriel, which upsets Sylvie.
26	6	"Ex-en-Provence"	Peter Lauer	Liz Eney	December 21, 2022
Emily travels with Gabriel and Alfie to Antoine's bastide in Bonnieux, Provence, to seal a deal. Alfie and Emily are invited by Gabriel to a restaurant he wants to visit, but Antoine makes Alfie cancel at the last minute. Emily feels uncomfortable after the meal when the waiter considers them a couple. Laurent arrives, upsetting Erik, who leaves for Paris. That night, Sylvie and Laurent are attacked by bees and escape by stripping and jumping into a pool, where they end up having sex. Emily discovers that a mistake ruined most of Antoine's perfume, "juice". She suggests that the good batch be released as a limited edition to maximize profits, which Antoine agrees to after hesitating. Camille continues her affair with Sofia, who invites her back to Greece. Camille declines, claiming she still loves Gabriel. Sofia responds that it is possible to love more than one person. After the event, Alfie asks Emily for the receipt for the lunch to expense it, but she remembers the staff complimenting her and Gabriel as a couple, so she lies and claims to not have it. Emily and Alfie leave for Paris in the limited edition McLaren that Antoine bought.
27	7	"How to Lose a Designer in 10 Days"	Katina Medina Mora	Joe Murphy	December 21, 2022
Mindy is invited by Nicholas to watch "How To Lose A Guy in Ten Days" at a park, and she invites Emily and Gabriel since Alfie is in London and Camille is in Greece with Sofia. Nicholas struggles to work with Pierre Cadault because they have different ideas, and Emily offers Grateau's help as Pierre is uncomfortable with JVMA. Emily and Gabriel leave the movie as a friend of Nicholas starts hitting on them. They enter a balloon exhibition, where they continue to have fun while taking pictures. At the night's end, Gabriel shares with Emily how his relationship with Camille is falling apart. Mindy and Nicholas admit they both like each other and share a kiss. Nicholas calls Emily and shares with Grateau that he plans on firing Pierre and replacing him with Grégory Elliott Duprée, whom Pierre despises, and hopes they relay the news to Pierre. Emily tries at the last minute to stop Pierre from joining them for lunch, but as he is crossing the street, he is hit by a motorbike taxi.
28	8	"Fashion Victim"	Katina Medina Mora	Alison Brown	December 21, 2022
Pierre recovers in the hospital after his accident, while Grateau cannot tell him about his firing. Nicholas plans to announce Gregory Dupree as the new face of Pierre Cadault during a new store opening, even though Emily asks him to wait for Pierre to get out of the hospital out of respect. Sylvie meets with Nicholas's father, Louis, Sylvie's former boss, and asks him to delay the announcement. Louis abused his power when Sylvie worked for him. Upset about the meeting, Nicholas claims he will not change his mind. Gabriel calls Emily, saying that he needs a friend, and that he thinks Camille will break up with him after seeing pictures of her partying with other men in Greece. Gabriel also confesses he still loves Emily. Sylvie and Emily break the news about JVMA replacing Pierre with him. Emily has an idea: make people believe Pierre has died, to have him appear at the event and announce he will continue his work without JVMA, which embarrasses the Deleon family. The next day, Emily finds Gabriel happy, as he says that Camille is back from Greece and everything is fine between them.
29	9	"Love Is in the Air"	Andrew Fleming	Grant Sloss	December 21, 2022
Alfie returns from London, and Emily is disappointed that he didn't mention their relationship to his family. Grateau's new client is a romance company, suggesting a couple to get engaged in a public way and get paid. Julien is annoyed by Emily's interference, but Sylvie dismisses his claims. Laurent is away, but he surprises Sylvie by attending their date at the opera. Gabriel offers to propose to Camille and asks Antoine for help in the restaurant. Camille and Gabriel get engaged, and Emily proposes a new idea using hot air balloons. Nicholas prepares a party for Mindy, and Emily asks to make amends with him. Alfie confesses not telling his family about her, and they decide to make their relationship public.
30	10	"Charade"	Andrew Fleming	Darren Star	December 21, 2022
Emily wants Gabriel's restaurant to have a Michelin Star. Luc contacts his ex, food critic Marianne, to taste the food and provide the star. Alfie tells Mindy about Nicholas kicking Emily out of a party. Sylvie is told by Laurent that he wants to open a club in Paris with Louis Deleon, Nicholas's father. When Emily gets involved in a campaign idea, Julien gets upset, yells at her and leaves. Mindy and Nicholas plan to go to Gabriel's and Camille's engagement party, but Benoit arrives and submits a song for her to the Eurovision Song Contest. Gabriel and Camille decide to get married at the party. Camille interrupts Gabriel during his vows, saying that she knows he loves Emily and broke a pact that she made with her not to pursue him. Alfie breaks up with Emily, suspecting that something exists between them and that he will not be her second choice. Later, Gabriel confesses to Emily that Camille did not return from Greece to fix their relationship, but to reveal that she is pregnant.

=== Season 4 (2024) ===
No. overall	No. in season	Title	Directed by	Written by	Original release date
Part 1
31	1	"Break Point"	Andrew Fleming	Grant Sloss	August 15, 2024
Camille's brother throws shade at Emily on his TikTok, saying that she broke up Gabriel and Camille. Emily tries to contact Alfie, but he ignores her and calls her only when he discovers images of himself and Emily are to be used in an advertising campaign. They are both supposed to arrive and kiss in a stadium while everyone watches them. Alfie arrives — but to break up with Emily. Gabriel sees the kiss and is clearly upset. Mindy and her band are upset when they are told they need to cover their expenses for Eurovision. Mindy gets the money after selling a dress Nico gifted her, when she hears his father badmouthing her and he does not defend her. Gabriel tells Emily that Camille has disappeared.
32	2	"Love on the Run"	Andrew Fleming	Alison Brown	August 15, 2024
Everyone is looking for Camille and after Emily sees Sofia's Instagram she believes Camille is in Greece with her. She tells Gabriel about Camille's and Sofia's secret romance, upsetting him. Sylvie discovers Julian has been recruited by JVMA, and Emily tells her his conduct has not changed as Mindy shares with her that female employees must get dressed in front of him. Sylvie has been contacted by a woman who plans to expose Leon's sexual harassment in the past with former employees, however she refuses since it would risk Antoine's new business since JVMA is financing it. Luc is having trouble dealing with Julian's previous clients, however he excels and impresses Sylvie and the client. Emily finds Camille and after a talk they come back to Paris, where she and Sofia express their love to each other. Gabriel is happy to see Camille and explains to her they are already a family.
33	3	"Masquerade"	Andrew Fleming	Joe Murphy	August 15, 2024
Emily discovers both Camille and Sofia living with Gabriel and has an uncomfortable moment with him when Mindy lets him use their shower without her knowing. Emily is working on Antoine's campaign for his new perfume "Heartbreak". The concept involves a masquerade party, since a mask hides someone's feelings. After Alfie is told by Camille that Emily and Gabriel are not together, he considers pursuing her. Emily decides to forget about both Alfie and Gabriel; however, it doesn't works as both of them look for her at the party. She picks Gabriel, and Alfie discovers it after he accidentally kisses another guest who is dressed just like Emily, then sees her leave with Gabriel. Sylvie decides to do the article exposing Louis de Leon, risking Laurent's business. She also thanks Mindy for sharing the info. Mindy looks for Nico, telling him that as much as he loves his father, he needs to be on the right side.
34	4	"The Grey Area"	Peter Lauer	Prathi Srinivasan & Joshua Levy	August 15, 2024
Emily feels uncomfortable with Sofia and Camille living with Gabriel, as they have no privacy. Therefore, she speaks with the landowner, telling her three people live in the apartment, which goes against the contract. Due to Sylvie's article exposing JVMA, Laurent loses his investment for his business, and she asks for help from her mother. Julien quits JVMA after he is asked to give them information about Sylvie and returns to work with her. Mindy's relationship is rocky after Leon is exposed. He asks her not to sing at Laurent's party, yet she does and he expresses her support after the company has asked Leon to quit. As they kiss, sad Benoit watches them. Camille and Sofia arrive at the party and tell Gabriel and Emily that they'll be moving next to Gabriel's apartment. Sofia tells Emily she knows that she had snitched on them, but that Camille would never move far as she and Gabriel are having a baby.
35	5	"Trompe l'oeil"	Erin Ehrlich	Joe Murphy	August 15, 2024
Emily represents a friend of Mindy who has a facial cream and hopes to improve its marketing at Grateau. It turns out it was a personal lubricant; however, since it is so popular, they decide to keep it quiet and raise its price. Marianne pushes Luc to ask Sylvie for a raise; however, he does it during Laurent's birthday which upsets Sylvie. Marianne is exposed as a fraud, as she was fired as a Michelin inspector, meaning Gabriel will never get his Michelin. When Emily tells, he fires the pastry chef which he didn't like and expresses he is happy the way he is. Sofia and Camille have issues in their relationship, which causes Sofia to move back to Greece. Camille goes to the gynecologist and discovers she's not pregnant; however, she doesn't tells Gabriel, as it hinted she wants him to be a part of her life.
Part 2
36	6	"Last Christmas"	Erin Ehrlich	Grant Sloss	September 12, 2024
Air France cancels Emily's flight home to Chicago because of bad weather, so Camille's father invites her to their family's holiday celebration at a French ski chalet. Gabriel promises to stay by Emily's side while skiing due to her inexperience but suddenly changes his mind and chooses to ski with Camille to protect her because he thinks that she is pregnant. While skiing, Emily falls and loses her phone, but a handsome Italian man named Marcello helps her down the hill. Emily breaks up with Gabriel after the incident because she is certain he "will always choose Camille" and will always treat her (Emily) as a mistress.
37	7	"Lost in Translation"	Peter Lauer	Alison Brown	September 12, 2024
An angry Gabriel points out to Emily he has trouble expressing his feelings to her because he must always do so in English. He then explains in French how he truly feels but Emily does not understand what he is saying. However, Geneviève, Sylvie's stepdaughter, overhears the conversation and translates for her, saying Gabriel feels they have communication issues and falsely adds he does not want to see her again. Later that evening, Emily and Mindy spot Geneviève having drinks with Gabriel.
38	8	"Back on the Crazy Horse"	Andrew Fleming	Liz Eney & Joe Murphy	September 12, 2024
Emily goes to a polo match and sees the Italian man who helped her on the slopes, Marcello. Mindy begins performing in a cabaret that specializes in topless female performers.
39	9	"Roman Holiday"	Andrew Fleming	Grant Sloss & Robin Schiff	September 12, 2024
Emily goes to Rome to visit Marcello. Sylvie shows up unexpectedly, angering/hurting Marcello and upsetting Emily because of the intrusion. Marcello walks away in a huff, thinking Emily was using him for work. Sylvie tells Emily they need to talk because Emily does not know the full story. Meanwhile, Mindy meets her boyfriend for dinner. He insults her by minimising the importance of Eurovision and discounting her dreams. He asks her what is more important, him or a "silly song contest." Mindy stands up and leaves in anger and hurt, crying only when she gets outside.
40	10	"All Roads Lead to Rome"	Andrew Fleming	Darren Star	September 12, 2024
Agence Grateau lands an account with the Umberto Muratori cashmere company but only for six months. Sylvie opens an office for Agence Grateau in Rome, appoints Emily as its manager and finds an apartment for her. Emily opens the window of her new apartment to a beautiful view echoing the beginning of the series when she first moved to Paris. Marcello visits her at her new apartment and they happily ride off together on a scooter to tour the city. Gabriel's restaurant receives a Michelin star but, at the same time, he obviously misses Emily. Also, he clarifies his relationship with Geneviève by telling her he does not want it to be romantic. She is disappointed. Mindy tells Antoine, Alfie and Gabriel that Emily has moved to Rome. Later, Gabriel asks Mindy where exactly in Rome Emily is, suggesting he intends to visit her.

=== Season 5 (2025) ===
No. overall	No. in season	Title	Directed by	Written by	Original release date
41	1	"La Dolce Emily"	Andrew Fleming	Darren Star	December 18, 2025
On her first day managing the Agence Grateau office in Rome, Sylvie decides they need to have more clients than just Muratori, starting with Bavazza. Gabriel arrives in Rome and sees Marcello and Emily kiss, upsetting him. Sylvie notices this and invites him to lunch. Emily gets to meet Marcello's sisters, but they consider Emily a gold digger. Antonia, Marcello's mother, tells Emily she only partnered with Agence Grateau to have JVMA lose interest. Mindy and Alfie start connecting romantically after their respective recent breakups. Sylvie re-encounters an old friend of hers, Princess Jane, who organizes a welcome party at her palace to help Sylvie gain new clients. Emily proposes re-branding Antoine's "Hello Bébé" baby fragrance as a signature scent for the Muratori brand. All parties seem on board with the idea, with Antonia and Antoine flirting while they dance at the end of the episode.
42	2	"Got to be Real"	Andrew Fleming	Joe Murphy	December 18, 2025
For Bavazzi's launch party, Emily gets Mindy hired as a performer, though she's hesitant to perform in a colossal cocktail. Genevieve tells Julien that Mindy and Alfie are together, as she saw them hooking up by Gabriel's restaurant. Antoine has Alfie fly out to Rome for the fragrance launch. Lucy, one of Marcello's ex-girlfriends, warns Emily not to get too attached to him. Mindy is conflicted about getting close to Alfie, knowing he is Emily's ex. Laurent arrives in Rome to see Sylvie together with Giancarlo, her Roman fling. Emily, upset after seeing Marcello talk to several women from his past, tells him that she feels what they have is not real. To prove Emily wrong, Marcello buys her a real Fendi purse (unlike her vintage Baguette bag which turned out to be fake), to show her that she has been real to him since the beginning.
43	3	"Intimissimi Issues"	Erin Ehrlich	Alison Brown	December 18, 2025
Emily is given a lingerie brand to work with, Intimissi. Alfie helps Mindy, who is struggling with a dance routine for popular Italian television show Ballando Ballando Ballando. The pair share a kiss, but Mindy stops it and insists they can't have a holiday fling. The dance goes horribly wrong when Mindy's partner tells her in Italian not to do the final leap due to his back pain, but she attempts it anyway due to not understanding him and they both tumble on the floor. Mindy sleeps with Alfie; and, when Emily calls her the following morning, she has to keep Alfie quiet in bed. Meanwhile, Sylvie and Giancarlo's on set squabbles drive their production off script and he quits the commercial. Sylvie, now in charge of directing the advertisement, won't let anyone see the final edit. She eventually tells Emily, freaking out and fearing she ruined the campaign, which causes Emily to be nervous as well.
44	4	"Rome Has Fallen"	Erin Ehrlich	Grant Sloss	December 18, 2025
The official launch of Muratori Paradiso takes place. Influencers and social media creators are invited, who will, in return, then share a post about the brand at the end of the night. Sylvie braces for premiere-day criticism, unsure if the commercial edited by her turned out well, but Emily still thinks it's good. Emily sneakily sends the ad film off Sylvie's phone to herself and showcases it, and it's liked by the audience. Giancarlo proposes a relationship to Sylvie, but she realizes she wants to be with Laurent. Antonia fires Emily after Solitano becomes infested with tourists. Marianne visits Luc and is discovered by his other love interest Bianca, who fires him, ending business with Bavazzi in both Rome and Paris. Marcello reveals to Emily he never stopped negotiating with JVMA. Emily, hurt that Marcello kept the negotiations a secret, questions his faith in her and she leaves Solitano without speaking to him and ignores his messages. Sylvie makes the decision to close the Agence Grateau office in Rome and return to Paris, saddening Emily as she was hoping to manage it. The end of the episode shows Princess Jane was the one who shared Solitano's location during a livestream.
45	5	"Bonjour Paris!"	Erin Ehrlich	Robin Schiff	December 18, 2025
Emily returns to Paris and is asked by Sylvie to act as a mediator between Antoine and Gabriel, who are having differences about their restaurant's menu: Gabriel wants to try something new, but Antoine insists on sticking with what got them a Michelin Star. Mindy asks Alfie to tell Emily about their relationship, and they plan to do it at a dinner but Mindy ends up swerving the conversation. Nico returns and looks to get back with Mindy, revealing he has left JVMA and his family's wealth and wants to prove he has changed his ways. Mindy has second thoughts on getting back with him. Sylvie unexpectedly becomes a plus one at home and isn't pleased when Laurent's "girlfriend" wears her robe. Sylvie has Emily fire Genevieve, and she blurts out to Emily that Mindy and Alfie have been seeing each other, and that Julien knew too. Gabriel quits at the restaurant to work with Thomas Heatherington, one of Agence Grateau's clients, on his yacht travelling around the world.
46	6	"The One Where Emily Goes to the Embassy"	Andrew Fleming	Liz Eney	December 18, 2025
Mindy moves out from Emily's apartment and stays with Julien after Emily snaps at the Alfie situation, questioning how she can ever trust Mindy again. Antoine is looking for Gabriel's replacement at the restaurant, and Emily suggests a competition between chefs. Sylvie gets Emily to set up a social media account for her so she can spy on her former best friend-turned-enemy Yvette. The pair reconnect and quickly pick up where they left off, although some tension still remains. Emily meets Jake, an American who works as a consular officer at the American Embassy in Paris. Nostalgic for a taste of home, she accepts his invitation to the Fourth of July party at his workplace and thoroughly enjoys herself. Emily and Mindy reconcile, as Mindy gets back with Nico and moves back in with her, much to the delight of Julien. Their friendship inspires Sylvie with an idea for L'Oréal, and it is approved.
47	7	"Second Chances"	Andrew Fleming	Joe Murphy	December 18, 2025
Marcello is in Paris and announces during Sylvie's panel that he is launching his own fashion brand "Marcello Muratori", separating himself from the Muratori family's business. Yvette unsuccessfully tries to set up Sylvie with a Swiss chocolatier at her dinner party. Sylvie leaves and meets a new fling outside a nearby tabac, a man younger than her, and they begin an amorous relationship. Agence Grateau starts working with a luxury water brand that has bad PR due to a homophobic backstory, and a new rebrand is suggested in order to stay afloat. Mindy tells Emily to stop running away from things, and she finally speaks with Marcello, reconciling with him.
48	8	"Fashion Statement"	Erin Ehrlich	Alison Brown	December 18, 2025
Emily is trying to help Nico and Marcello with their business, and she cleverly charms the dog of a designer called Noah well enough to score a meeting with and hire him. Tension between Mindy and Alfie arises as he begins a financial consultancy role to help out with Nico and Marcello's venture. Neither Alfie or Mindy can forget their past connection. Sylvie is appalled when she discovers Beau, her new fling, turns out to be her friend Yvette's son. The launch of "Marcello Muratori" doesn't go well, as Antonia sues her son Marcello for trademark infringement and Noah consequently bails on the project. After Emily learns Marcello did the sketches himself, she encourages him to be the designer.
49	9	"La Belle Époque"	Andrew Fleming	Grant Sloss	December 18, 2025
Emily contacts Pierre Cadault, who offers an atelier to help Marcello design. He also offers an opportunity to participate in the Venice Fashion Week, but there is a sharp two-week turnaround. Marcello becomes discouraged when his sister Livia arrives and says his collection is not good, asking Emily to cancel his participation in the coveted showcase. Gabriel arrives in Paris and reunites with Emily for lunch, asking her to hand him some knives he had left. Gabriel shares with Emily that he followed her to Rome and saw her with Marcello. They reminisce about old times and he wishes her to be happy - Emily reciprocates. Sylvie learns from her mother that Laurent has severe financial issues - he ran two nightclubs into the ground and borrowed money against Sylvie's mother's property. Enraged, Sylvie asks for a divorce. Marcello changes his mind, thanks Emily for always believing in him even when he didn't and tells her that they are going to Venice.
50	10	"Veni, Vidi, Venezia"	Andrew Fleming	Joe Murphy & Don Roos	December 18, 2025
In Venice, Emily finds an engagement ring in Marcello's bag and is slightly disheartened as he doesn't imminently propose. The fashion show is almost ruined with a high tide, and another venue can't be booked, so rain boots and raincoats are bought and given to guests in order to salvage the show. Antonia arrives at the show, drops the lawsuit, congratulates Marcello and names him the "House of Muratori" successor. Sylvie learns that even divorcing Laurent won't help her as her assets will be frozen as well, meaning Agence Grateau will be sold or liquidated. She tells Julien and Luc to look for new jobs, but doesn't tell Emily. Alfie calls Mindy asking to talk to her when she returns to Paris, but she gets engaged to Nico and it turns out that the ring Marcello was keeping was for him. During the proposal, Emily reveals that she can't marry Marcello as her life is in Paris; he was planning for them to move to Solitano. They break up after realizing that they both want different things. Alfie finds out about the engagement, clearly disappointed, and Mindy realizes she has feelings for him. Emily arrives back at Agence Grateau and learns that Princess Jane is now an equity partner, a move taken to help save the business. Sylvie texts Gabriel, telling him Emily is back in Paris and is no longer with Marcello, and to do with that information what he pleases. After being given a few weeks off work by Thomas, Gabriel sends Emily a postcard from the yacht asking her to meet him in Greece.

=== Season 6 (2026) ===
No. overall	No. in season	Title	Directed by	Written by	Original release date
51	1	TBA	TBA	Joe Murphy	December 24, 2026
52	2	TBA	TBA	Grant Sloss	December 24, 2026
53	3	TBA	TBA	Darren Star	December 24, 2026
54	4	TBA	TBA	Alison Brown	December 24, 2026
55	5	TBA	TBA	Liz Eney	December 24, 2026
56	6	TBA	TBA	Joey Murphy	December 24, 2026
57	7	TBA	TBA	Alison Brown	December 24, 2026
58	8	TBA	TBA	Joe Murphy	December 24, 2026
59	9	TBA	TBA	Joe Murphy	December 24, 2026
60	10	TBA	TBA	Darren Star	December 24, 2026

== Production ==
=== Development ===
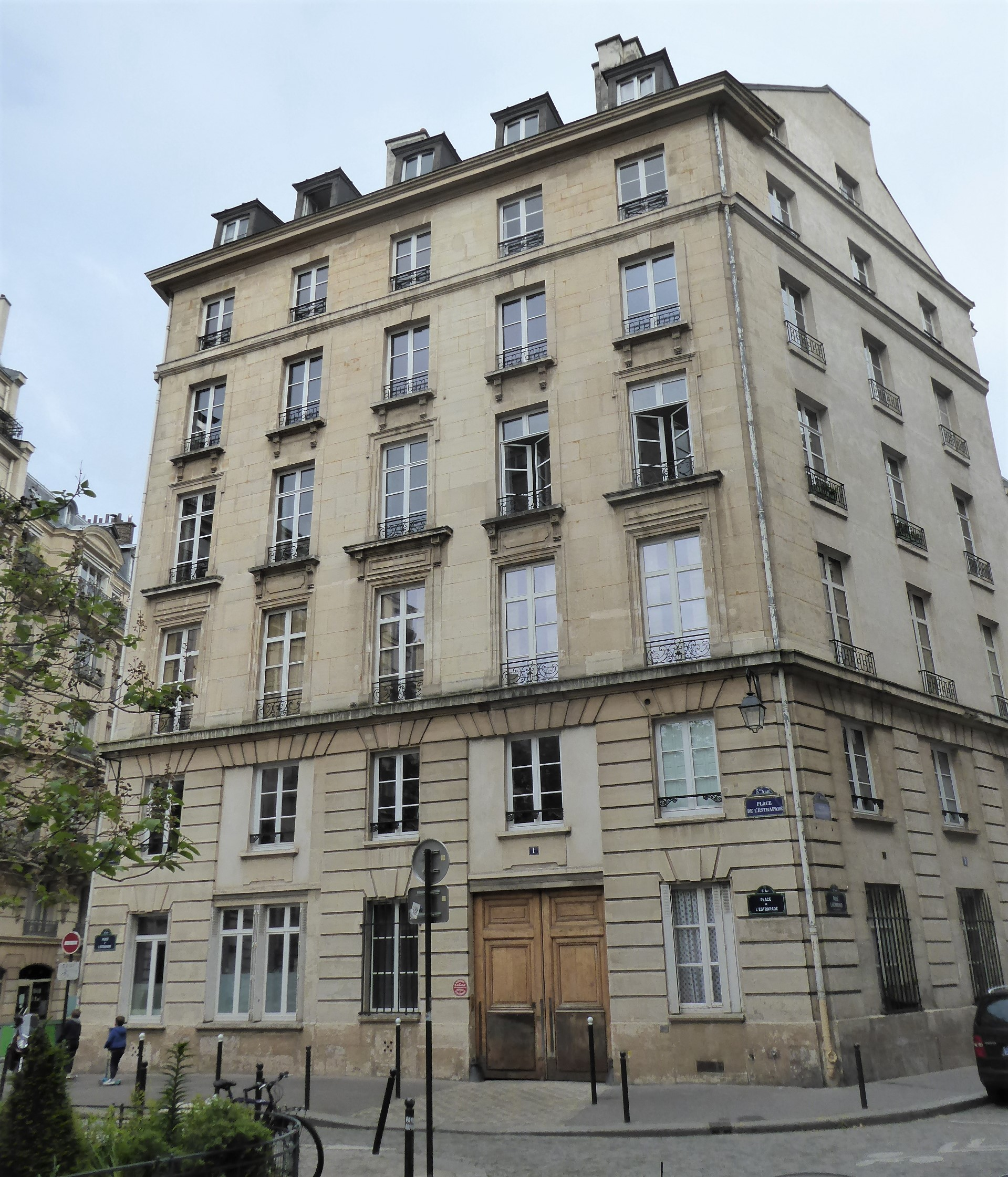
Emily's chambre de bonne residence, a top-floor garret, 1 place de l'Estrapade

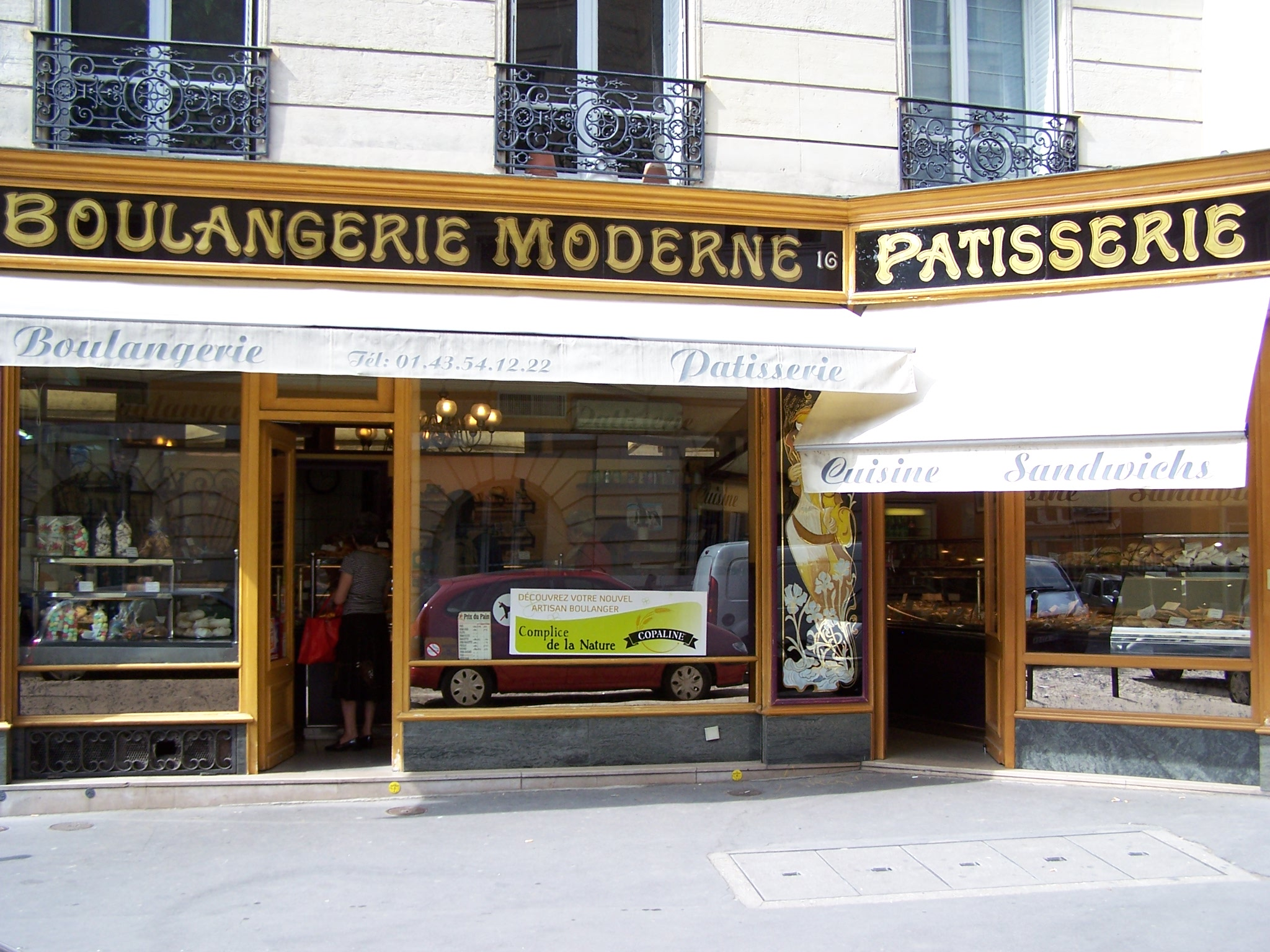
La Boulangerie Moderne, a bread and pastry shop, 16 rue des Fossés-Saint-Jacques

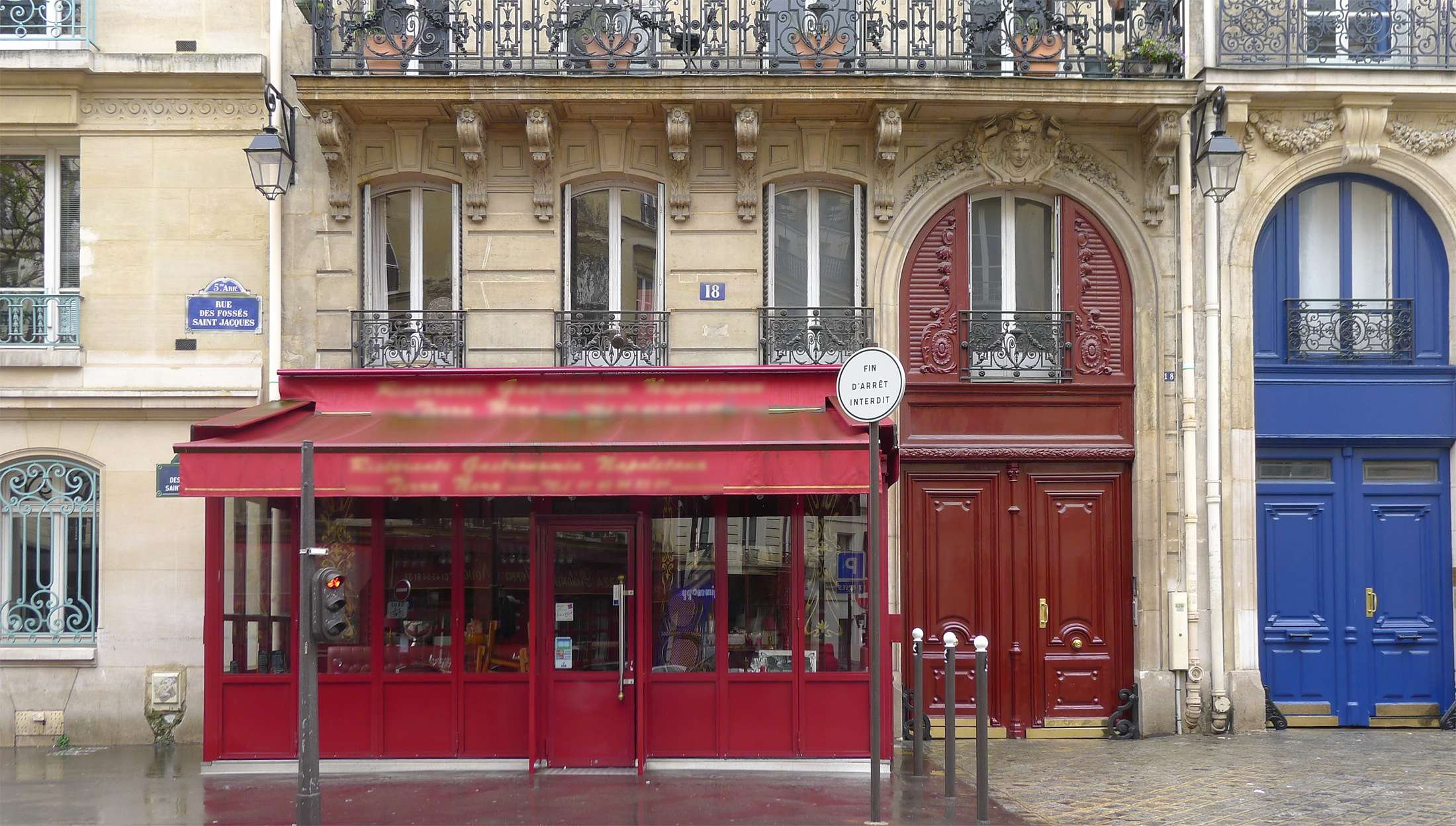
The restaurant, ("Les Deux Compères"), 18 rue des Fossés-Saint-Jacques

The series was created by Darren Star, who has a multi-year overall deal with ViacomCBS and develops for ViacomCBS and for outsider buyers via MTV Studios. Star was also expected to serve as an executive producer alongside Tony Hernandez. Jax Media was reported to be involved in a producing role. On September 5, 2018, it was announced that Paramount Network had given the production a series order for a first season consisting of 10 episodes.

On July 13, 2020, it was reported that the series would move from Paramount Network to Netflix. On November 11, 2020, Netflix renewed the series for a second season. On January 10, 2022, Netflix renewed the series for a third and fourth season. On September 16, 2024, Netflix renewed the series for a fifth season. On January 5, 2026, the series was renewed for a sixth season which was announced to be the final one on May 21, 2026.

=== Casting ===
On April 3, 2019, Lily Collins was cast as the titular Emily. On August 13, 2019, Ashley Park had joined the main cast. On September 19, 2019, Philippine Leroy-Beaulieu, Lucas Bravo, Samuel Arnold, Camille Razat, and Bruno Gouery joined the cast in starring roles, while Kate Walsh, William Abadie, and Arnaud Viard were cast in recurring roles. On May 24, 2021, Lucien Laviscount was cast in a recurring role, while Abadie was promoted to series regular for the second season. On April 10, 2022, Laviscount was promoted to series regular for the third season. On January 22, 2025, Laviscount returned as a series regular for the fifth season after appearing as recurring in the fourth season. On April 17, 2025, it was confirmed that Razat would not be returning for the fifth season. On May 14, 2025, Minnie Driver was cast in an undisclosed capacity for the fifth season. On July 2, 2025, Bryan Greenberg and Michèle Laroque joined the cast in recurring capacities while Paul Forman and Arnaud Binard would be returning for the fifth season.

=== Filming ===
Principal photography for the first season, in Paris and its suburbs, began in August 2019. Additional photography took place in Chicago in November 2019.

Many scenes are filmed at Place de l'Estrapade in the 5th Arrondissement, including the site of Emily's apartment, the restaurant ("Les Deux Compères"), and the bakery ("La Boulangerie Moderne"). Some scenes are also filmed at Cité du Cinéma, a film studio complex in Saint-Denis. Famous Parisian sites to feature in the series include Le Grand Véfour, the Pont Alexandre III, Palais Garnier, Atelier des Lumières, Rue de l'Abreuvoir, Jardin du Luxembourg, Jardin Du Palais Royal, Café de Flore and the Panthéon. An episode was also filmed at the Château de Sonnay in the department of Indre-et-Loire.

Filming for the second season began on May 3, 2021, and concluded on July 19, 2021. New filming locations for the second season include Monnaie de Paris, Musée des Arts Forains, Huatian Chinagora in Saint-Tropez, Palace of Versailles, Villefranche-sur-Mer, Grand-Hôtel du Cap-Ferrat, and other locations in France. Filming of the second season in Paris caused problems within the 5th Arrondissement, with the residents deeming the crew as brutal, threatening and too intrusive. Lily Collins stated that the second season was set in a COVID-19-free world, as the decision was made by the producers to ensure escapism through joy and laughter. In scenes that involved crowds, masks were off when they were on-camera and back on once completed, which Collins stated was difficult to pull off. Filming for the third season began in June 2022. On June 6, 2023, it was reported that filming for the fourth season has been delayed due to the writers strike. Filming for the fourth season began on January 19, 2024. New filming locations for season 4 include the Crazy Horse venue, Sacré Coeur, Monet's house in Giverny, Stade Roland Garros, Saint-Ouen flea market, Piscine Molitor and Paris' Musée Baccarat. Filming also took place in Italy with shootings in Rome and Ostia Antica (Solitano in the show). It was reported that Emily in Paris is set to start filming season 5 in the spring of 2025. The show will be filming in Paris the first week of May and continue to follow Emily to Rome as she navigates her life between the two cities. On July 14, 2025, Luca Zaia, governor of the Veneto region of Italy, announced that the series is scheduled to film in Venice between August 5–15, 2025. On August 23, 2025, it was reported that filming had been suspended following the death of assistant director Diego Borella, who collapsed while preparing a final scene inside Hotel Danieli in Venice on the night of August 21, but had since resumed filming. Season 5 wrapped filming on August 26, 2025.

Filming for the sixth and final season began in May 2026, with Monaco and Greece as new shooting locations, and wrapped in September 2026.

=== Soundtrack ===
In October 2020, Ashley Park's "La Vie en rose", sung a cappella by Mindy Chen in episode six, debuted at number one on Billboard's Top TV Songs chart. Kid Francescoli's "Moon", sung in episode four, debuted at number four, and Cavale's "Burst Into Flames" from episode ten debuted at number seven. Alter K, a French music publisher and distributor, made significant contributions to the soundtrack, with half of the songs in the series being from its catalog. James Newton Howard composed the series' theme music and score.

=== Costuming ===
To create the characters' wardrobes, costume designer Marylin Fitoussi worked with Patricia Field, a costume designer who previously worked for Sex and the City. In a December 2025 interview with The New York Times, Fitoussi said the choice of costuming was meant to represent the characters' personalities, rather than depict clothing worn by real people. She told the media outlet, "I want to play with clothes. I want to show people that if you are dressed in a different way, you will think in a different way." A variety of real luxury brands were used, such as Vivienne Westwood, Balmain, and Valentino.

== Release ==
The series' first season was released by Netflix on October 2, 2020, followed by a DVD release on November 9, 2021. The second season was released on December 22, 2021. The third season had its premiere at the Théâtre des Champs-Élysées in Paris on December 6, 2022, and was released on December 21. The fourth season premiered in two parts; the first premiered on August 15, 2024, followed by the second on September 12, 2024. The fifth season premiered on December 18, 2025. The sixth and final season is scheduled to premiere on December 24, 2026.

== Reception ==
=== Audience viewership ===
For the week of October 5, 2020, Emily in Paris reached the top ten list of most watched streaming shows per Nielsen. On May 3, 2021, Netflix revealed that the series had been watched by 58 million households in the month after its debut. The series remained in UK top 10 list for 40 consecutive days after its release.

=== Critical response ===
Critical response of Emily in Paris
Season	Rotten Tomatoes	Metacritic
1	61% (57 reviews)	58 (18 reviews)
2	61% (24 reviews)	64 (11 reviews)
3	67% (18 reviews)	54 (10 reviews)
4	68% (37 reviews)	47 (13 reviews)
5	76% (21 reviews)	57 (12 reviews)

For the first season, review aggregator Rotten Tomatoes reported an approval rating of 61% based on 57 reviews, with an average rating of 5.7/10. The website's critics' consensus reads, "Though its depiction of France is très cliché, Emily in Paris is rom-com fantasy at its finest, spectacularly dressed and filled with charming performances." Metacritic gave the first season a weighted average score of 58 out of 100 based on 18 reviews, indicating "mixed or average reviews".

The second season has a 61% approval rating on Rotten Tomatoes, based on 24 reviews, with an average rating of 5.2/10. The website's critics' consensus states, "Emily in Paris remains a sugary soufflé, but it's liable to give a toothache to viewers seeking anything more profound than a frivolous romp." On Metacritic, the second season received a score of 64 based on reviews from 11 critics, indicating "generally favorable reviews".

For the third season, review aggregator Rotten Tomatoes reported an approval rating of 67% based on 18 reviews, with an average rating of 5.7/10. The website's critics' consensus reads, "Emily in Paris' bubbly watch ability keeps threatening to go flat in a third season that seems content to spin its wheels, but this gallic travelogue will still be a pleasant enough journey for fans." Metacritic gave the season a weighted average score of 54 out of 100 based on 10 reviews, indicating "mixed or average reviews".

The fourth season has a 68% approval rating on Rotten Tomatoes, based on 37 reviews, with an average rating of 5.9/10. The website's critics' consensus states, "Emily in Paris' frivolous charms begin to sag in a fourth season that tries on some serious conflict for a change, but it remains pleasurable enough that fans won't be forsaking their timeshares anytime soon." On Metacritic, the fourth season received a score of 47 based on reviews from 13 critics, signifying "mixed or average".

The fifth season holds a 76% approval rating on Rotten Tomatoes, based on 21 reviews. Metacritic gave the season a weighted average score of 57 out of 100 based on 12 reviews, indicating "mixed or average reviews".

Daniel D'Addario of Variety described the series as "a delight that poses the question of what it really means to grow up, against a truly inviting backdrop", and that Collins is "an inherently winsome performer who has never been quite as well used as she is here". Kristen Baldwin of Entertainment Weekly gave the series a "B" and wrote, "If you need a five-hour brain vacation, Paris is a worthwhile destination." The New Zealand Herald considered the show "visually delectable" and that "Collins has a pixie-ish charm which makes her endearing", but also that the show is "as ephemeral as fairy floss". Kristen Lopez of IndieWire praised Collins for being a "jewel, make no mistake" and that "Emily in Paris is only as watchable and frivolous as its leading lady," but criticized the series as a whole, writing: "Emily in Paris is like scrolling through Instagram. It's a great way to waste time looking at pretty pictures with no depth."

A few critics have pointed to the show's self-aware engagement with social media. In the New York Times, Jason Farago called it "an anamorphic projection of @emilyinparis, Emily's Instagram account, into moving pictures." In the New Yorker, Kyle Chayka writes that "The purpose of Emily in Paris is to provide sympathetic background for staring at your phone, refreshing your own feeds[...] It's O.K. to look at your phone all the time, the show seems to say, because Emily does it, too." Defending the show in Artforum, Harmon Siegel argued that this effect is self-aware, writing that, "When it hurtles into bizarrerie, Emily mocks us for not paying attention. It anticipates and parodies its expected reception as 'ambient television.'"

Some people criticized Emily's character. Emma Gray from HuffPost called Emily a bland character, stating, "The show doesn't even make an effort to quirk her up or give her a more relatable, girl-next-door roughness: she's always immaculately coiffed and made-up and garbed in effortfully eye-catching outfits. But there's not much to the character except for enormous self-confidence and the inexplicable ability to attract new friends and love interests on every street corner." Rebecca Nicholson of The Guardian gave the series one out of five stars: "[...] if it is an attempt to fluff up the rom-com for the streaming age, then it falls over on its six-inch heels." Rachel Handler opined "Darren Star has done it yet again: centered an entire show on a thin, gently delusional white woman whimsically exploring a major metropolitan area in wildly expensive couture purchased on a mid-level salary."

Sarah Moroz of Vulture.com opined, "The most egregious oversight [...] is Emily herself, who shows zero personal growth over a ten-episode arc. [...] Emily's vapidity baffles anyone who has moved from their native country." Sonia Rao of The Washington Post compared Emily to the heroines of the Amy Sherman-Palladino universe: "Like the Gilmore girls, Emily is strong-willed and refuses to let anything get in the way of her schemes. Like Midge Maisel, her actions can be quite rash, but she still wins over her fictional acquaintances while utterly baffling viewers." Megan Garber of The Atlantic was critical of Emily, writing, "An expat who acts like a tourist, she judges everything against the backdrop of her own rigid Americanness. You might figure that those moments are evidence of a show poking fun at its protagonist's arrogance or setting the stage for her to grow beyond her initial provincialism. But: You would be, as I was, mostly incorrect. Instead, other people change around her. They grudgingly concede that her way (strident, striving, teeming with insistent individualism) is right. The latest show from Sex and the City creator Darren Star—sells several fantasies. Primary among them is the notion that Emily can bulldoze her way through France and be celebrated for it." Siegel cast Emily as a personification of the critic's own self-loathing, saying " I am now sincerely, even zealously convinced that, in my initial reaction of smug self-satisfaction, I was lured into an ambush, my response anticipated and rebutted[...] For it is not just that I need her; I am her."

Some critics, such as Jo Ellison, writing for the Financial Times, appeared ambivalent. On the one hand, she expressed admiration for the way Darren Star manages to depict "a version of womanhood in which promiscuity, bossiness, and shopaholics are depicted as qualities to be celebrated"; on the other, "the major plot lines might have been written in the 1940s and the Frenchies are routinely cast as vain, preening and parochial." She concludes, "Cliché-ridden and completely outdated: Darren Star's 'Sex and the Cité' will no doubt be monstrously successful."

Many French critics condemned the show for negatively stereotyping Parisians and the French. Charles Martin wrote in Première that the show unfairly stereotyped and depicted the French as "lazy [individuals who] never arrive at the office before the end of the morning [...] are flirtatious and not really attached to the concept of loyalty [...] are sexist and backward, and [...] have a questionable relationship with showering". A reviewer at Sens Critique wrote: "Emily in Paris projects the same twee, unrealistic image of Paris that the film Amélie does". RTL.fr wrote: "Rarely had we seen so many clichés on the French capital since the Parisian episodes of Gossip Girl or the end of The Devil Wears Prada."

=== Cultural influence ===
The show's popularity has reportedly increased tourism in Paris, with hotels and restaurants benefiting from "the Emily effect". Tours of locations that appear on the show are available. An American living in Paris complained of "dozens of raucous 'Emily in Paris' pilgrims who now swarmed [Café de Flore], taking Instagram-ready selfies". A 2024 survey by the Centre national du cinéma et de l'image animée found that 38% of tourists cited Emily in Paris as a reason for visiting the city. While French Green Party politicians criticized the show for not promoting enough awareness of the climate crisis, the Paris tourist office listed ten important filming locations on its website. French president Emmanuel Macron—whose wife Brigitte made a cameo on the show—said that Emily in Paris was good for France, and he would try to prevent it from moving to Rome ahead of its fifth season.

=== Controversies ===
==== Depiction of Ukrainian character ====
The second season was met with controversy in Ukraine over the depiction of a Ukrainian character named Petra (a name not used in Ukraine), who was depicted as a petty thief and shoplifter, with the hashtag "Ми не Петри" (My ne Petry, We are not Petras) trending for a few hours. The Ukrainian Minister of Culture, Oleksandr Tkachenko, wrote on the social media platform Telegram, "In Emily in Paris, we have a caricature image of a Ukrainian woman that is unacceptable. It is also insulting." He also wrote a letter to Netflix complaining about the depiction of Petra. According to Tkachenko, Netflix sent a response saying that they had heard the dissatisfaction of Ukrainian viewers, and that Petra would be shown in a different context for the third season.

==== Bribery allegations at the 78th Golden Globe Awards ====
The show's first season received two nominations at the 78th Golden Globe Awards, but prior to the ceremony, it was reported that 30 members of the voting body had been flown to Paris, where they spent two nights at The Peninsula Paris and were treated to a private lunch at the Musée des Arts Forains, with the bill reportedly paid by the show's developer, Paramount Network. This led some critics to question the impartiality of the voting body, as Emily in Paris was considered to be a critical failure, and its nomination was a surprise. In contrast, critically acclaimed shows, notably I May Destroy You, were not nominated.

=== Accolades ===
Accolades received by Emily in Paris
Award	Year (Note: Indicates the year of ceremony)	Category	Recipient(s)	Result	Ref.
American Society of Cinematographers Awards	2025	Outstanding Achievement in Cinematography in Episode of a Half-Hour Series	Seamus Tierney (for "Masquerade")	Nominated	
Astra TV Awards	2024	Best Supporting Actress in a Streaming Series, Comedy	Ashley Park	Nominated	
Australian Academy of Cinema and Television Arts Awards	2025	Audience Choice Award for Favourite Television Show	Emily in Paris	Nominated	
Art Directors Guild Awards	2021	Excellence in Production Design for a Half Hour Single-Camera Television Series	Anne Seibel (for "Emily in Paris")	Nominated	
Art Directors Guild Awards	2023	Excellence in Production Design for a Half Hour Single-Camera Television Series	Anne Seibel (for "What's It All About..." and "How to Lose a Designer in 10 Days")	Nominated	
Art Directors Guild Awards	2025	Excellence in Production Design for a Half Hour Single-Camera Television Series	Anne Seibel (for "The Grey Area" and "All Roads Lead to Rome")	Nominated	
Costume Designers Guild Awards	2021	Excellence in Contemporary Television	Patricia Field and Marylin Fitoussi (for "Faux Amis")	Nominated	
Costume Designers Guild Awards	2022	Excellence in Contemporary Television	Patricia Field and Marylin Fitoussi (for "French Revolution")	Won	
Costume Designers Guild Awards	2023	Excellence in Contemporary Television	Marylin Fitoussi (for "What's It All About...")	Nominated	
Costume Designers Guild Awards	2025	Excellence in Contemporary Television	Marylin Fitoussi (for "The Grey Area")	Nominated	
Costume Designers Guild Awards	2026	Excellence in Contemporary Television	Marylin Fitoussi (for "Veni, Vidi, Venezia")	Nominated	
Critics' Choice Television Awards	2021	Best Supporting Actress in a Comedy Series	Ashley Park	Nominated	
Golden Globe Awards	2021	Best Television Series – Musical or Comedy	Emily in Paris	Nominated	
Golden Globe Awards	2021	Best Actress in a Television Series – Musical or Comedy	Lily Collins	Nominated	
Hollywood Music in Media Awards	2024	Best Song – Onscreen Performance (TV Show or Limited Series)	Ashley Park – "Ruins"	Won	
Make-Up Artists & Hair Stylists Guild Awards	2022	Best Contemporary Make-Up in a Television Series, Television Limited or Miniseries or Television New Media Series	Odile Fourquin, Aurélie Payen, Carole Nicolas, and Corinne Maillard	Nominated	
Make-Up Artists & Hair Stylists Guild Awards	2022	Best Contemporary Hair Styling in Television and New Media Series	Odile Fourquin, Mike Desir, Carole Nicolas, and Frederic Souquet	Won	
Make-Up Artists & Hair Stylists Guild Awards	2023	Best Contemporary Make-Up in a Television Series, Limited Series or Miniseries, or Movie for Television	Aurélie Payen, Joséphine Bouchereau, Carole Nicolas, and Corinne Maillard	Nominated	
Make-Up Artists & Hair Stylists Guild Awards	2023	Best Contemporary Hair Styling in a Television Series, Limited Series or Miniseries, or Movie for Television	Carole Nicolas, Mike Désir, Miharu Oshima, and Julien Parizet	Nominated	
Make-Up Artists & Hair Stylists Guild Awards	2025	Best Contemporary Make-Up in a Television Series, Limited Series or Miniseries, or Movie for Television	Aurelie Payen, Carole Nicolas, Fred Marin, Sarah Damen, and Josephine Bouchereau	Won	
Make-Up Artists & Hair Stylists Guild Awards	2025	Best Contemporary Hair Styling in a Television Series, Limited Series or Miniseries, or Movie for Television	Carole Nicolas, Mike Desir, Julien Parizet, Remy Pilot, and Miharu Oshima	Nominated	
Make-Up Artists & Hair Stylists Guild Awards	2026	Best Contemporary Make-Up in a Television Series, Limited or Movie for Television	Aurélie Payen, Sarah Damen, Fred Marin, Fanny Maurer, and Carole Nicolas	Nominated	
Make-Up Artists & Hair Stylists Guild Awards	2026	Best Contemporary Hair Styling in a Television Series, Limited or Movie for Television	Carole Nicolas, Mike Desir, Miharu Oshima, Jay Durimel, and Julien Parizet	Nominated	
MTV Movie & TV Awards	2021	Best Show	Emily in Paris	Nominated	
MTV Movie & TV Awards	2021	Best Breakthrough Performance	Ashley Park	Nominated	
MTV Movie & TV Awards	2021	Best Kiss	Lily Collins and Lucas Bravo	Nominated	
MTV Movie & TV Awards	2021	Best Duo	Lily Collins and Ashley Park	Nominated	
MTV Movie & TV Awards	2022	Best Kiss	Lily Collins and Lucien Laviscount	Nominated	
MTV Movie & TV Awards	2022	Best Musical Moment	Ashley Park – "Dynamite"	Nominated	
Primetime Emmy Awards	2021	Outstanding Comedy Series	Andrew Fleming, Tony Hernandez, Lilly Burns, Darren Star, Alison Brown, Grant Sloss, Stephen Joel Brown, Shihan Fey, Jake Fuller, Lily Collins, and Raphaël Benoliel	Nominated	
Primetime Creative Arts Emmy Awards	2021	Outstanding Production Design for a Narrative Program (Half-Hour or Less)	Anne Seibel, Jean-Yves Rabier, and Christelle Maisonneuve (for "Emily in Paris")	Nominated	
Primetime Creative Arts Emmy Awards	2022	Outstanding Production Design for a Narrative Program (Half-Hour or Less)	Anne Seibel, Beniôt Tételin, and Christelle Maisonneuve (for "The Cook, The Thief, Her Ghost and His Lover"; "Scents & Sensibility"; "French Revolution")	Nominated	
Primetime Creative Arts Emmy Awards	2023 (Note: The ceremony was scheduled for 2023, but was postponed to 2024 due to 2023 Hollywood labor disputes.)	Outstanding Contemporary Costumes for a Series (Area)	Marylin Fitoussi, Herehau Ragonneau, Daniela Telle, and Marie Fremont (for "What's It All About...")	Nominated	
Primetime Creative Arts Emmy Awards	2023	Outstanding Contemporary Hairstyling	Carole Nicolas, Mike Désir, Frédéric Souquet, Miharu Oshima, Jessie Durimel, and Julien Parizet (for "Coo D'état")	Nominated	
Primetime Creative Arts Emmy Awards	2023	Outstanding Contemporary Makeup (Non-Prosthetic)	Aurélie Payen, Corinne Maillard, Joséphine Bouchereau, Sarah Damen, and Ivana Carboni (for "What's It All About...")	Nominated	
Primetime Creative Arts Emmy Awards	2025	Outstanding Cinematography for a Series (Half-Hour)	Seamus Tierney (for "Masquerade")	Nominated	
Primetime Creative Arts Emmy Awards	2025	Outstanding Contemporary Costumes for a Series	Marylin Fitoussi, Chloé Bartonio, and Herehau Ragonneau (for "The Grey Area")	Nominated	
Primetime Creative Arts Emmy Awards	2025	Outstanding Contemporary Hairstyling	Carole Nicolas, Miharu Oshima, Mike Désir, Julien Parizet, and Stéphane Delahaye (for "Back on the Crazy Horse")	Nominated	
Primetime Creative Arts Emmy Awards	2026	Outstanding Contemporary Costumes for a Series	Marylin Fitoussi, Chloé Bartonio, Herehau Ragonneau, and Daniela Telle (for "Veni, Vidi, Venezia")	Nominated	
Primetime Creative Arts Emmy Awards	2026	Outstanding Contemporary Hairstyling	Carole Nicolas, Mike Desir, Julien Parizet, Jay Durimel, and Miharu Oshima (for "Veni, Vidi, Venezia")	Nominated	
Set Decorators Society of America Awards	2021	Best Achievement in Décor/Design of a Half-Hour Single-Camera Series	Christelle Maisonneuve and Anne Seibel	Nominated	
Set Decorators Society of America Awards	2022	Best Achievement in Décor/Design of a Half-Hour Single-Camera Series	Christelle Maisonneuve and Anne Seibel	Nominated	
Set Decorators Society of America Awards	2023	Best Achievement in Décor/Design of a Half-Hour Single-Camera Series	Isabelle Girard and Anne Seibel	Nominated	
Set Decorators Society of America Awards	2026	Best Achievement in Décor/Design of a Half-Hour Single-Camera Series	Alexandra Lassen and Anne Seibel	Nominated	

== See also ==
- French television
