= Kid Francescoli =

French musical group

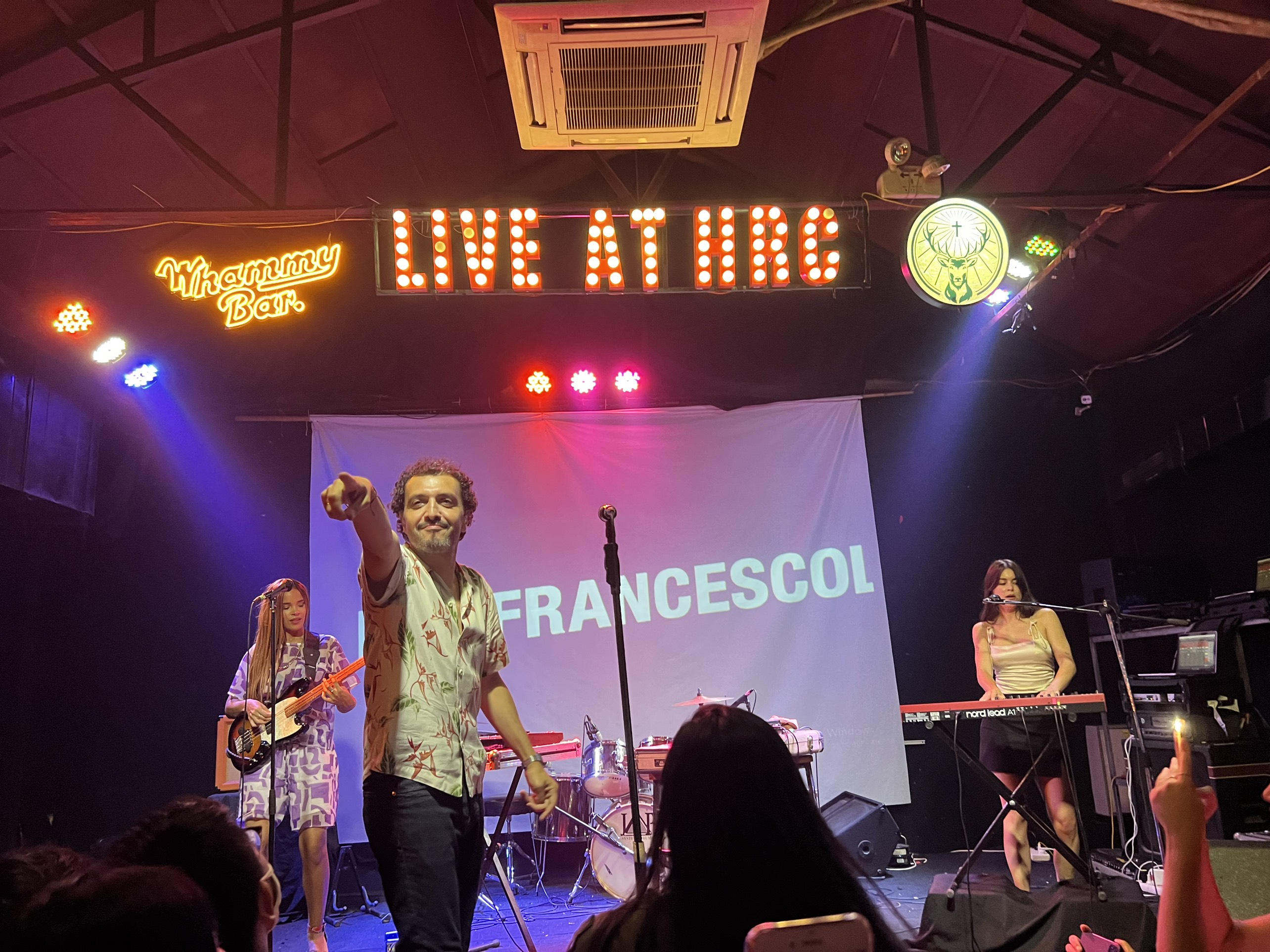
- Kid Francescoli in Hanoi in 2022

Background information
- Origin: Marseille, Bouches-du-Rhône, France
- Genres: Electropop; Indie pop
- Members: Mathieu Hocine; Andrea Durand; Raphaël Léger
- Past members: Julia Minkin; Mathieu Chrétien; Laetitia Abello; David Borras; Olivier Scalia; Nicolas Viégeolat; Lena Woods; Maud Ferron

Kid Francescoli is an electropop project by French musician Mathieu Hocine. The project was founded by Hocine in 2002 in Marseille. The name is a tribute to Olympique de Marseille Uruguayan football player Enzo Francescoli. In 2009, Hocine began working with musician Julia Minkin, with whom he co-wrote songs, and drummer Mathieu Chrétien, who plays drums in live shows.

== History ==
In 2006, Hocine released a self-titled debut album, under the name Kid Francescoli. In 2016, Kid Francescoli released With Julia, featuring both Hocine and Minkin.

In 2017, Francescoli released an album entitled Play Me Again, which was the group's most successful album, as of 2025. Francescoli's song, "Moon (And It Went Like)", on which Minkin hums and recorded a line via a voice memo, went "viral" on social media, especially on Instagram Reels and TikTok with shares by musicians Jennifer Lopez and Lizzo. The song was particularly popular on TikTok in 2020, and was also featured on season one of American romantic comedy-drama Netflix series Emily in Paris. As of March 2020, the song had garnered 18 million Spotify streams.

In 2020, Francescoli released an album called Lovers. In 2023, Francescoli released a new album, entitled Sunset Blue, which was mastered by French DJ Alex Gopher.

In October 2025, Minkin released a solo single, co-produced and co-written by her husband, called Daisy.

In October 2026, Kid Francescoli released the album A Kind of Wave, touring Europe and North America in support of it.
