= Samuel Arnold (actor) =

French actor and dancer

- Arnold in 2026
- Born: July 11, 1991 (age 35)
- Occupation: Actor
- Years active: 2011–present

Samuel Arnold (born 11 July 1991) is a French actor. He gained popularity for starring in the Netflix TV series Emily in Paris.

== Career ==
When Arnold was 18, he participated and was a finalist in the French TV show La France a un incroyable talent. From 2012 to 2013, he studied acting at EICAR, The International Film & Television School Paris. Then, he went on to study at the Giles Foreman Centre For Acting from 2013 to 2015.

On 19 January 2022, it was announced that Arnold signed a deal with APA. Arnold has also appeared in a National Theater Live production of Antony & Cleopatra alongside Ralph Fiennes and Sophie Okonedo, and in the Canal+ comedy series Platane.

He plays the role of Julien in the Netflix TV series Emily in Paris. He was one of the voices for the French version of Pandemica, an animated content series about a world where the pandemic never ends.

== Filmography ==
Year	Film	Role	Director	Notes	Ref.
2011	Platane	a graffiti artist	Eric Judor, Denis Imbert	TV series (2 episodes)	
2016	Tuer un homme	Rufin	Isabelle Czajka		
2020–present	Emily in Paris	Julien	Darren Star	TV series (30 Episodes), main cast	
2021	Pandemica	voice of a mountaineer	Dante Buford	TV series (7 episodes)	
