= Ken Watkins =

Australian rules footballer, born 1919

Personal information
- Full name: Ken Watkins
- Born: 17 August 1919
- Died: 18 April 1984 (aged 64)
- Height: 179 cm (5 ft 10 in)
- Weight: 80 kg (176 lb)

Playing career^{1}
Years	Club	Games (Goals)
1944	North Melbourne	5 (0)
- ^{1} Playing statistics correct to the end of 1944.

Ken Watkins (17 August 1919 – 18 April 1984) was an Australian rules footballer who played with North Melbourne in the Victorian Football League (VFL).
