= Michael Samuels (director) =

British television director, producer and writer

Michael Samuels is British television director, producer and writer.

He directed Any Human Heart for which he won a BAFTA, and in 2018 he won an International Emmy for Man in an Orange Shirt. He also won a Royal Television Society Award for The Curse of Steptoe. Other works include The Falklands Play, The Vice, The Last Days of Lehman Brothers, Mrs. Mandela, The Fear, Black Work, and Close To Me.

Samuels directed The Windermere Children, broadcast in the UK on the BBC on 27 January 2020, about the child refugees who survived the concentration camps and were taken to the English Lakes District in an attempt to rehabilitate them. The film won the Prix Europa Award for Best European Television Movie of the year 2020, and was nominated for a BAFTA in 2021.
