= Formica Blues Tour =

1998 concert tour by Mono

- Tour by Mono
- Location: North America; Europe
- Start date: 1 April 1998
- End date: 9 May 1998
- Legs: 2
- No. of shows: 21

Mono's 1998 tour, promoting the album Formica Blues, was the only tour undertaken by the band, which formed in 1996 and broke up in the years following the tour.

The inclusion of the single "Life in Mono" in the soundtrack to the 1998 film Great Expectations may have been responsible for an influx of radio requests for the song following the film's release. At the same time, however, Mono remained virtually unknown in their home country; the tour's destinations balanced out accordingly, with a dedicated U.S. leg but no dates in the UK at all. This was to be followed afterwards by additional U.S. concerts, with the band scheduled to join the 1998 Lilith Fair lineup during part of the U.S. leg of the traveling music festival.

In order to recreate the sounds of the Formica Blues songs in live performances, ADAT recordings were used alongside the musicians: guitarist, bassist, and drummer, plus band keyboardist, programmer, and producer Martin Virgo on keyboards and samples. In particular, the drum parts were a combination of pre-programmed as well as live.

== Tour dates ==
The itinerary of the tour, as announced on 11 March 1998 on the band's official website, follows (with an amendment from other sources):

Date	City	Country	Venue
1 April 1998	Chicago	United States	Double Door
3 April 1998	San Francisco	United States	Bimbo's
4 April 1998	Seattle	United States	ARO Space
5 April 1998	San Jose	United States	Cactus Club
8 April 1998	Los Angeles	United States	El Rey Theatre
10 April 1998	Atlanta	United States	Cotton Club
11 April 1998	Washington, D.C.	United States	9:30 Club
13 April 1998	Boston	United States	Paradise Rock Club
14 April 1998	New York City	United States	Shine
17 April 1998	Toronto	Canada	Lee's Palace
23 April 1998	Paris	France	Divan du Monde
24 April 1998	Brussels	Belgium	Ancienne Belgique
25 April 1998	Amsterdam	Netherlands	Melkweg
27 April 1998	Cologne	Germany	Prime Club
28 April 1998	Hamburg	Germany	Logo
1 May 1998	Copenhagen	Denmark	Hyperstate @ Forum
2 May 1998	Oslo	Norway	Hyperstate @ Spektrum
4 May 1998	Stockholm	Sweden	Studion
5 May 1998	Lund	Sweden	Palladium
8 May 1998	Athens	Greece	Net
9 May 1998	Athens	Greece	Net

== Shows ==
Concert reviews mention video projections being used, playing "pseudo-psychedelic background pictures" on "two 1-metre by 1-metre screens", flanked by "faux-Corinthian half-columns" that supported the projectors. The set ran 40–45 minutes, with up to two encores (reprising songs from the main set). Opening acts were sometimes present: The Devlins opened in San Francisco, while no band opened in Toronto. Attendance varied: the Toronto show was reportedly nearly sold out, while the Amsterdam show was reportedly underattended (beaten out by a simultaneous Björn Again concert in the adjacent hall). "Life in Mono" was the main focus, being used in a "sing-along session" at the Toronto concert, as well as being played again during one of the encores.

Reviewers complained about poor sound quality (including an inaudible guitarist) and singer Siobhan de Maré's speaking voice (including a "Cockney patter", and overly enthusiastic shouting described as more appropriate for arena rock). At the San Francisco show, audience members were reported walking out after "Life in Mono" had been played. The band members recalled more enthusiastic experiences, describing in a chat transcript audience members jumping onstage and dancing at the Seattle show.

=== Setlist ===
This setlist is from the April 25 Amsterdam concert. Nine out of ten songs from Formica Blues are played, leaving out "Hello Cleveland!", the only instrumental.

1. "Silicone"
  - sample
2. "The Blind Man"
3. "Disney Town"
4. "The Outsider"
  - sample
5. "Slimcea Girl"
6. "Life in Mono"
7. "Penguin Freud"
  - sample
8. "High Life"
9. "Playboys"

Encore:

1. "Life in Mono"
2. "High Life"

(However, the second encore was not played at this particular concert.)

== Personnel ==
- Siobhan de Maré: vocals
- Martin Virgo: keyboards/programming
- James Thorp: electric/acoustic guitar, keyboards
- Magnus Box: bass guitar
- "Mikey (from Bristol)": drums

Electronic equipment used consisted of a Fender Rhodes electric piano, a Roland A-33 MIDI controller, and two digital samplers: a Roland S-760, and an Akai S3000.

== Other promotion ==
The band played a handful of other promotional performances: a "Rolling Stone event" in New York City on March 26, The RuPaul Show on April 6, Loveline on April 7, KCRW's Morning Becomes Eclectic on April 9, Late Night with Conan O'Brien on April 14, and Modern Rock Live on April 19.
