= Music of La Femme Nikita =

This is a list of the music featured in the television series La Femme Nikita. Each song listed appears under its relevant episode according to air date.

== Songs featured in each episode ==
=== Season 1 ===
Episode 1: "Nikita"

- Chainsuck – Big Mistake
- Philosopher Kings – All To Myself
- Thrive – Revenge
- Rose Chronicles – Blood Red
- Tristan Psionic – 3AM

Episode 2: "Friend"

- Huevos Rancheros – Night of the Iguana
- Merlin – Last Playboy Interview

Episode 3: "Simone"

- Kat Rocket – Slacker Boy Blue
- Mark Stewart – Red Zone
- Christoph von Gluck – Chi Mai Dell'Erebo (from the opera Orfeo ed Euridice, Act 2, Scene 1)
- Christoph von Gluck – O You Shades Whom I Implore (from the opera Orfeo ed Euridice, Act 2, Scene 4)
- Christoph von Gluck – Recitative (from the opera Orfeo ed Euridice)

Episode 4: "Charity"

- Philosopher Kings – All Dressed Up in San Francisco
- Holly Cole Trio – Jersey Girl
- Clove – In Your Life
- SIANspheric – Watch Me Fall
- Tristan Psionic – All Of The Important Things I've Done

Episode 5: "Mother"

- Original music composed by Sean Callery: New Life

Episode 6: "Love"

- Big Sugar – Standing Around Crying
- Big Rude Jake – Night of the King Snake
- Big Sugar – Still Waiting
- Filter – Hey Man Nice Shot
- Clove – News
- Moonsocket – Expressions of Loneliness

Episode 7: "Treason"

- Diego Marulanda – La Cumbia, La Cumbia
- Diego Marulanda – La Noche
- Sister Machine Gun – Red

Episode 8: "Escape"

- Beverly Klass – Temple
- Rhea's Obsession – Cun Lacoudhir (The Breaking Ice)
- Rose Chronicles – Torn
- Tara MacLean – Evidence

Episode 9: "Gray"

- Guru Stefan – Tsunami
- Morcheeba – Howling

Episode 10: "Choice"

- Rhea's Obsession – Death by Moonlight
- Vibrolux – Drown

Episode 11: "Rescue"

- Enigma – Beyond the Invisible

Episode 12: "Innocent"

- In the Nursery – Precedent

Episode 13: "Recruit"

- SIANspheric – Broken Man

Episode 14: "Gambit"

Episode 15: "Obsessed"

- Garbage – #1 Crush
- In the Nursery – Woman

Episode 16: "Noise"

- Afro-Celt Sound System – Inion
- BT – Love, Peace, and Grease
- Morcheeba – Tape Loop

Episode 17: "War"

- DJ Keoki – Majick
- Original music composed by Sean Callery: Swinging Cages

Episode 18 Missing"

- Morphine – Hanging on a Curtain

Episode 19: "Voices"

- In the Nursery – Mandra
- SIANspheric – The Stars Above
- Vibrolux – Ground

Episode 20: "Brainwash"

- Gang Chen, He Zhan Hao – The Butterfly Lovers Violin Concerto

Episode 21: "Verdict"

- PJ Harvey – Working for the Man

Episode 22: "Mercy"

- Depeche Mode – The Love Thieves
- Rodgers and Hart – My Romance – Jazz version

=== Season 2 ===
Episode 1: "Hard Landing"

- Depeche Mode – The Love Thieves
- Original music composed by Sean Callery: Reunited

Episode 2: "Spec Ops"

- Orbital – Satan
- Prodigy – Smack My Bitch Up
- Original music composed by Sean Callery: Get Over It

Episode 3: "Third Person"

- Headrillaz – Weird Planet

Episode 4: "Approaching Zero"

- Les Jumeaux – Carrousella
- Sweetback – Gaze
- Sister Machine Gun – Burn

Episode 5: "New Regime"

- Sarah McLachlan – Do What You Have To Do
- Pilgrimage – Path to the Invisible

Episode 6: "Mandatory Refusal"

- Curve – Chinese Burn [Flood Mix version]
- DJ Krush (featuring Deborah Anderson) – Skin Against Skin

Episode 7: "Half Life"

- Beth Orton – Tangent
- Jacques Brel – Les Bourgeois (sang by Denis Forest)

Episode 8: "Darkness Visible"

- Original music composed by Sean Callery

Episode 9: "Open Heart"

- Original music composed by Sean Callery

Episode 10: "First Mission"

- Original music composed by Sean Callery

Episode 11: "Psychic Pilgrim"

- Original music composed by Sean Callery: Nikita Contacting the Spirit World

Episode 12: "Soul Sacrifice"

- Adam F – Dirty Harry (Grooverider remix)
- Juno Reactor – Komit

Episode 13: "Not Was"

- Jerusalem Salsa Band – Oye Me Israel
- Mimi Goese – Fire and Roses

Episode 14: "Double Date"

- Fluke – Absurd
- Garbage – #1 Crush
- Mono – Life in Mono
- Propellerheads – Take California

Episode 15: "Fuzzy Logic"

Episode 16: "Old Habits"

- DJ Keoki – Space
- The Crystal Method – (Can't You) Trip Like I Do

Episode 17: "Inside Out"

Episode 18: "Off Profile"

- Hednoize – Loaded Gun
- Morcheeba – Fear and Love
- Massive Attack – Angel

Episode 19: "Last Night"

- Diana Krall – Gentle Rain
- Mono – Silicone

Episode 20: "In Between"

- Esthero – Superheroes
- Stereolab – Refractions In The Plastic Pulse

Episode 21: "Adrian's Garden"

- Gus Gus – Gun

Episode 22: "End Game"

=== Season 3 ===
Episode 1: "Looking For Michael"

- Gearwhore – 11-11
- Mickey Hart – Temple Caves
- Original music composed by Sean Callery: Searching for Michael

Episode 2: "Someone Else's Shadow"

- Mandalay – Please

Episode 3: "Opening Night Jitters"

- Autour de Lucie – Chanson Sans Issue (Ne Vois-Tu Pas) Remix (Bonus Track)
- Gus Gus – Is Jesus Your Pal

Episode 4: "Gates Of Hell"

- Gabriel Fauré – Élégie, Op. 24
- Gus Gus – Is Jesus Your Pal

Episode 5: "Imitation Of Death"

- Love Spirals Downwards – Sunset Bell

Episode 6: "Love And Country"

Episode 7: "Cat And Mouse"

- Lamb – Gorecki

Episode 8: "Outside The Box"

- Thrive – Revenge
- Vibrolux – Superstar
- Sixty Channels – Ride with the Flow

Episode 9: "Slipping Into Darkness"

Episode 10: "Under The Influence"

- Hooverphonic – Eden

Episode 11: "Walk On By"

Episode 12: "Threshold Of Pain"

- Moa – Can't Forget You
- Original music composed by Sean Callery: Saying good-bye

Episode 13: "Beyond The Pale"

- Françoise Hardy – Ma Jeunesse Fout Le Camp

Episode 14: "Hand To Hand"

- Makyo – The Third Gate of Dreams
- Rhea's Obsession – Death by Moonlight

Episode 15: "Before I Sleep"

- Cream – I Feel Free

Episode 16: "I Remember Paris"

- Christoph von Gluck – Recitative
- Original music composed by Sean Callery: Leaving Paris

Episode 17: "All Good Things"

- Craig Armstrong (featuring Elizabeth Fraser) – This Love
- Original music composed by Sean Callery: Waterfront Shootout

Episode 18: "Third Party Ripoff"

- Afro-Celt Sound System (featuring Sinéad O'Connor; Iarla O¨Liomaird) – Release
- Original music composed by Sean Callery: Bathtub for Two

Episode 19: "Any Means Necessary"

Episode 20: "Three Eyed Turtle"

Episode 21: "Playing With Fire"

- David Sylvian – Thalheim

Episode 22: "On Borrowed Time"

- Hooverphonic – This Strange Effect
- Original music composed by Sean Callery: Push the button, Nikita

=== Season 4 ===
Episode 1: "Getting Out Of Reverse"

- Lamb – Lullaby
- Lunatic Calm – Leave You Far Behind

Episode 2: "There Are No Missions"

- Everything But The Girl – No Difference
- Kill Transmission – Despair

Episode 3: "View Of The Garden"

- Original music composed by Sean Callery

Episode 4: "Into The Looking Glass"

- Makyo – Chandan

Episode 5: "Man In The Middle"

- Death in Vegas – Death Threat
- Gus Gus – Teenage Sensation
- Sofa Surfers – Sofa Rockers Richard Dorfmeister Remix

Episode 6: "Love, Honor and Cherish"

- Original music composed by Sean Callery

Episode 7: "Sympathy For The Devil"

- Iron Butterfly – In-A-Gadda-Da-Vida

Episode 8: "No One Lives Forever"

- Jennifer Meller aka Jen Beast (written by Bob Mair & Joel Wachbrit) – Unglued

Episode 9: "Down A Crooken Path"

- Original music composed by Sean Callery

Episode 10: "He Came From Four"

- DJ Keoki (Dimension 23) – I.M.O.K.R.U.O.K. (Remixed)

Episode 11 Time To Be Heroes"

- Hardknox – Attitude
- Kill Transmission – Dying Wish
- Rob Zombie – Subliminal Seduction – Living Dead Girl (remix)
- Original music composed by Sean Callery: Everything Happened So Fast

Episode 12: "Hell Hath No Fury"

- Original music composed by Sean Callery

Episode 13: "Kiss The Past Good-bye"

- Original music composed by Sean Callery

Episode 14: "Line In The Sand"

- Frédéric Chopin – Nocturn Op. 15 No. 3 in G Minor

Episode 15: "Abort, Fail, Retry, Terminate"

Episode 16: "Catch A Falling Star"

- Ernest Tubb – I Ain't Been Right Since You Went Wrong
- Ernest Tubb – Give Me an Old Fashion Love
- Neko Case and Her Boyfriends – Guided Wire
- Neko Case and Her Boyfriends – No Need To Cry
- Neko Case and Her Boyfriends – Thrice All American
- Patsy Cline – Crazy

Episode 17: "Sleeping With The Enemy"

- Enigma – Modern Crusaders
- Rob Zombie – Dragula

Episode 18: "Toys In The Basement"

- Tom Tykwer/J. Klimek/R. Heil – Supermarket

Episode 19: "Time Out Of Mind"

Episode 20: "Face In The Mirror"

Episode 21: "Up The Rabbit Hole"

- Sarah McLachlan – I Love You
- Original music composed by Sean Callery: Reunited
- Original music composed by Sean Callery: Defection

Episode 22: "Four Light Years Farther"

- Dot Allison – Tomorrow Never Comes

=== Season 5 ===
Episode 1: "Déjà Vu All Over Again"

- PJ Harvey – Big Exit
- Original music composed by Sean Callery: Get Over It

Episode 2: "A Girl Who Wasn't There"

- Nancy Wilson and Cannonball Adderley – Save Your Love For Me

Episode 3: "In Through The Out Door"

- The Experiment – The Cost of Freedom
- Juno Reactor – Badimo

Episode 4: "All The World's A Stage"

- Euphoria (featuring G. Webster) – Powerdrive
- Hardrive 2000 (featuring Lynae) – Never Forget (When You Touch Me)
- Wake Up Instrumental—- LAL
- Ingrid Kertesi – Bist Du Bei Mir, attributed to JS Bach, but of Stölzel
- W. Sommers – Sad Noodle

Episode 5: "The Man Behind The Curtain"

- Emissary (featuring Beverly Klass) – Scarlet Skies

Episode 6: "The Evil That Men Do"

- Coldplay – We Never Change
- Juno Reactor – High Energy Protons (Orion remix)

Episode 7: "Let No Man Put Asunder"

- Mandalay – Enough Love

Episode 8: "A Time For Every Purpose"

- Autour de Lucie – Immobile
- Coldplay – Spies
- Future Sound of London – Expander
- Original music composed by Sean Callery: Always Trust Your Father
