= Stargazing (disambiguation) =

Stargazing refers to amateur astronomy.

Stargazing may also refer to:

== Music ==
=== Albums ===
- Stargazing (Alpha album), 2003
- Stargazing (Søren album), 2017

=== EPs ===
- Stargazing (EP), an EP by Kygo
- Stargazing Live!, a live EP by Søren

=== Songs ===
- "Stargazing" (Kygo song), 2017
- "Stargazing" (Myles Smith song), 2024
- "Stargazing" (Travis Scott song), 2018
- "Stargazing", a song by Abramelin from Abramelin
- "Stargazing", a song by Adeem from Sweet Talking Your Brain
- "Stargazing", a song by Alisha from Alisha
- "Stargazing", a song by Alpha from The Sky Is Mine
- "Stargazing", a song by Earlene Bentley featuring Sylvester
- "Stargazing", a song by Leon Jackson from Right Now
- "Stargazing", a song by The Neighbourhood from Chip Chrome & the Mono-Tones
- "Stargazing", a song by OneRepublic from Artificial Paradise
- "Stargazing", a song by Søren from Stargazing
- "Stargazing", a song by Tinashe from Reverie
- "Stargazing", a song by Kid Cudi from Free

== Television ==
- Stargazing Live, a BBC Two television programme
- Stargazing, a CBeebies television programme

== Books ==
- Stargazing: Memoirs of a Young Lighthouse Keeper, a book by the Scottish author, Peter Hill

== Fish ==
- Stargazing darter (Percina uranidea), a species of fish
- Stargazing minnow (Phenacobius uranops), a species of freshwater ray-finned fish beloinging to the family Leuciscidae
- Stargazing seadevil (Ceratias uranoscopus), a species of marine ray-finned fish belonging to the family Ceratiidae

== Other ==
- Stargazing syndrome, a neurological disorder in reptiles caused by injury or disease, such as inclusion body disease

== See also ==
- Stargazin, CACNG2 gene
