= Dan Jones (composer) =

British composer, director and sound designer

Dan Jones is a British composer and sound designer working in film and theatre. He read music at the University of Oxford, studied contemporary music theatre at the Banff Centre for the Arts and studied electro-acoustic composition and programming at the Centro Ricerche Musicali in Rome. Having explored various means of generating music algorithmically, he is the author of one of the earliest pieces of software for generating fractal or self-similar music. He has won BAFTA and Ivor Novello Awards. He composed the score for the Peabody Award-winning documentary film Bobi Wine: The People's President.

== Career ==
His scores for feature films include Shadow of the Vampire (starring John Malkovich and Willem Dafoe), In Transit (also starring John Malkovich), Jericho Mansions (starring James Caan) and Menno Meyjes' Max (starring John Cusack), for which he received the Ivor Novello Award for Best Film Score 2004. He also scored Meyjes' follow up film Manolete (starring Adrien Brody and Penélope Cruz).

He has written for all the major British television broadcasters and his work includes Sir David Attenborough's The Life of Mammals, the BBC series Strange, Pawel Pawlikowski's drama "Twockers", Charlie Brooker's Channel 4 horror series "Dead Set" and Francesca Joseph's "Tomorrow La Scala", Channel 4's three-part documentary " Visions of Heaven and Hell" shown in 1994. He collaborated with Sebastião Salgado, John Berger and Paul Carlin on the BBC Arena (television) special "The Spectre of Hope". He recently composed the music for the BAFTA Best Drama Serial Any Human Heart for Channel 4 which also won both BAFTA and Ivor Novello Best Television Score Awards. More recently, he composed the music for ITV's controversial Fred West drama, 'Appropriate Adult'.

In 1997 he teamed up with British trip hop group Alpha producing orchestral arrangements for their albums ComeFromHeaven, The Impossible Thrill and Jarvis Cocker's cover of "This is Where I Came In" for Massive Attack's Melankolic label.

He has also created music and soundscapes for large scale public artworks. He is the co-creator, with artist Luke Jerram, of Sky Orchestra where music is played from seven hot air balloons positioned over a city, making it one of the largest sound works in the world. After an initial informal performance in Bristol in 2003, Sky Orchestra was first successfully staged in Birmingham commissioned by Fierce! and was later re-commissioned by Fierce and the Royal Shakespeare Company as part of the Complete Works Festival. Sky Orchestra opened the Sydney Festival in 2007 and has also toured to Canada and Switzerland. He also produced the sound design for "Listening Posts, an art work by Daphne Wright to commemorate the Irish emigrants who left Cork's harbourside which produces an ever changing sound score throughout the year. His most recent work is Suburban Counterpoint subtitled "Music for Seven Ice Cream Vans" which was co-commissioned by London International Festival of Theatre (LIFT), Norfolk and Norwich Festival and The Sydney Festival. In an idea dating back to 2000 the work, as the title suggests, uses seven ice cream vans to produce a surround sound score which inhabits an entire neighbourhood at once.

Other works include the score for the Rambert Dance Company's "Slippage" by choreographer William Tuckett. His music has been used by The European Space Agency and incorporated into Isaac Julien's Paradise Omeros which is exhibited at Tate Modern, London.

He is founding member and co-artistic director of Sound and Fury Theatre Company whose productions pioneer the immersive use of experimental sound design. He co-directed and sound designed the theatre production Kursk which toured the UK after a sellout run at the Young Vic theatre in London. It was also performed at the Drill Hall in Edinburgh in 2009 at the festival and at the Sydney Opera House in 2011.

He was the first ever recipient of a special jury prize for sound design at the Prague Quadrennial for his work on Sound and Fury's production of Kursk alongside fellow sound designer Kathrine Sandys for her piece Hush.

In 2019 he was commissioned to create a work for the PRS New Music Biennial for which he adapted Music for Seven Ice Cream Vans which played outside on the Southbank Centre and toured to Hull

His musical work is published by Faber Music

== Awards and nominations ==
- Ivor Novello Award, Winner Best Original Filmscore, Max – 2004
- Prague Quadrennial 2011 Winner Special Jury Prize for Excellence in Sound Design, Kursk, Sound and Fury at the Young Vic
- BAFTA, Winner Television Music, Any Human Heart — 2011
- Ivor Novello Award, Winner Best Original Television Music, Any Human Heart — 2011
- Primetime Emmy Award, Nominee for Outstanding Main Title Theme Music, Any Human Heart — 2011
- Primetime Emmy Award, Nominee for Best Music Composition for a miniseries, movie or special, Any Human Heart — 2011
- OFTA Television Award, Nominee for Best Music in a Non-Series, Appropriate Adult — 2012
- Ivor Novello Award, Nominee Best Original Filmscore, Louis Theroux ~ My Scientology Movie – 2017
- World Soundtrack Awards, Nominee for Discovery of the Year, Lady Macbeth – 2017
- Royal Television Society, Craft and Design Awards, Nominee for Best Title Music, SS-GB
- Ivor Novello Award, Winner Best Original Television Music, The Miniaturist – 2018
- Ivor Novello Award, Nominee Best Original Television Music, SS-GB – 2018
- Music and Sound Awards, Nominee Best Television Music, The Miniaturist – 2018
- Music and Sound Awards, Nominee Best Sound Design for a Feature Film, Lady Macbeth – 2018
- Music and Sound Awards, Nominee Best Title Theme, World On Fire – 2020
- Ivor Novello Award, Nominee Best Original Television Music, The Outlaws – 2021
- Grierson Award, Nominee Best Current Affairs Documentary, Bobi Wine: The People's President – 2024
- Ivor Novello Award, Winner Best Sound Art, Each Tiny Drop - 2024

== Discography ==
- Shadow of the Vampire (original soundtrack) — 2001
- Anazapta (original soundtrack) — 2002
- The Life of Mammals (original soundtrack) — 2003
- Max (original soundtrack) — 2006
- Dead Set (original soundtrack) — 2008
- Any Human Heart (original soundtrack) – 2010
- The Hollow Crown ~ The Wars of the Roses (original soundtrack) – 2016
- Louis Theroux ~ My Scientology Movie (original soundtrack) – 2016
- Lady Macbeth (original soundtrack) – 2016
- Any Human Heart (original soundtrack) – 2017
- The Miniaturist (original soundtrack) – 2018
- SS-GB (original soundtrack) – 2019
- Westwood Punk Icon Activist (original soundtrack) – 2019
- Man in an Orange Shirt (original soundtrack) – 2017
- PRS Foundation's New Music Biennial 2019 Music for Seven Ice Cream Vans – 2019
