= Tomorrow Never Comes (disambiguation) =

Tomorrow Never Comes is a 1978 British-Canadian crime film directed by Peter Collinson and starring Oliver Reed and Susan George.

Tomorrow Never Comes may also refer to:

== Albums ==
- Tomorrow Never Comes (Slim Whitman album), a 1970 album by Slim Whitman
- Tomorrow Never Comes (Rancid album), a 2023 album by Rancid
- Tomorrow Never Comes, the soundtrack to the film by Roy Budd
- Tomorrow Never Comes – Anthology 69–06, by Magna Carta

== Songs ==
- "Tomorrow Never Comes" (song), a 1945 song by Ernest Tubb
- "Tomorrow Never Comes", a 1957 single by Billy "The Kid" Emerson
- "Tomorrow Never Comes", a song by Dot Allison, from a 1999 episode of La Femme Nikita
- "Tomorrow Never Comes", a song by the Zac Brown Band from their 2015 album Jekyll + Hyde
- "Tomorrow Never Comes", a song by Nebula from their 2019 album Holy Shit
- "Tomorrow Never Comes", a song by Rancid from their 2023 album Tomorrow Never Comes

== See also ==
- "If Tomorrow Never Comes", song by Garth Brooks
