= Mono (British band) =

British electronic music duo (1996–2000)

- Origin: London, England
- Genres: Trip hop
- Years active: 1996–2000
- Labels: Echo, Mercury
- Past members: Siobhan de Maré; Martin Virgo

Mono was a British electronic music duo which had a hit in the late 1990s with their song "Life in Mono". The group's music is often described as trip hop, based on its similarities to contemporary electronic music acts including Sneaker Pimps and Portishead. Audible, and frequently cited, influences in Mono's songs include jazzy instrumentation reminiscent of 1960s spy film soundtracks and production styles rooted in 1960s pop music.

== Biography ==
=== History ===
The band, formed in late 1996 in London, consisted of singer Siobhan de Maré and Martin Virgo on keyboards, synthesizer programming, and production. Virgo, trained in classical piano at the Guildhall School of Music and Drama, had been working as a session musician since the early 1990s as part of the production team of Nellee Hooper, which led to credits on a remix of Massive Attack's "Unfinished Sympathy" (considered one of the landmark songs of trip hop's "Bristol sound") and Björk's 1993 album Debut. De Maré comes from a family with several generations of history in entertainment; her father was Tony Meehan, drummer for the Shadows, her grandfather was one of the Gongmen featured in the opening logo sequences in Rank Organisation films, and her grandmother was a dancer who worked with Shirley Bassey. She had been working as a session singer for hip hop and R&B musicians, as well as writing and touring, though much of this material consisted of underground and white label releases.

The two were introduced to each other while in London in pursuit of their respective musical projects: Virgo was in the midst of a break in session work, while de Maré had been planning to set up a personal recording studio in Paris. Despite different musical influences (de Maré by R&B and soul, Virgo by 1960s pop standards, and classical music from sources such as France and the Second Viennese School), their collaborative songwriting efforts apparently meshed easily. Virgo describes the demos recorded at this time as comprising ideas such as "Parliament breaks under bits of Serge Gainsbourg". After some demo tapes were distributed among music industry executives, the band received a number of contract offers from record labels. The pressure of this drove them to form a group, even with de Maré having gone on vacation in Los Angeles at this point. Originally planning to use the name Tremelux, they chose instead Mono, derived from the title of the Phil Spector release Back to Mono.

The band signed a UK-only contract at first with Echo Records, passing up labels like Warner, Island, and London. Their first release, in 1996, was an EP of the song "Life in Mono" and various remixes, most notable of these being two by the Propellerheads, a popular big beat band and remix group at the time. This was followed by the Formica Blues album in 1997.

In 1998, the use of "Life in Mono" in the soundtrack, trailers, and end credits of the film adaptation of Great Expectations (after Robert De Niro, who was working on the film, heard the song) brought greater exposure for the song than ever before, and it became the number one most requested song on US radio stations (such as KROQ-FM in Los Angeles, KITS in San Francisco, and WNNX in Atlanta) for weeks following the film's release. (In terms of specific radio stations, for example, "Life in Mono" made #45 on the KROQ Top 106.7 Countdown of 1998 and #76 on the 91X Top 91 of 1998, while Formica Blues was #73 on Toronto's 102.1 The Edge's 1998 year-end top 102 albums countdown.) With the band's new U.S. deal with Mercury Records (signed with then-A&R vice president Steve Greenberg, who had reportedly been looking to sign the band from the start), promotional singles of "Life in Mono" were also distributed to nightclubs at about the same time as modern rock stations, though only later was the single provided to Top 40 stations.

Now at the height of their popularity, Mono embarked on their only concert tour. After a quiet period, however, the band broke up in 2000. De Maré now sings for Violet Indiana featuring Robin Guthrie of the group Cocteau Twins; later, in 2004, she recalled feeling "creatively stifled" as part of Mono. Violet Indiana has released a number of singles, two albums and a singles collection. More recently, de Maré also founded Pearl Dust, a music management company. Virgo went on to work with a number of high profile artists including Alanis Morissette (for the film Dogma); Rob Fusari (Lady Gaga), whilst continuing with his keyboard session work on a number of album releases. He also wrote music for film and TV, winning a British Television Advertising Craft Award for best original music for the cinema advertisement ‘What Do You See’. He also played live keyboards for a number of bands including International Love Corporation; The Bellagios (appearing at Glastonbury festival); Maiuko and Mampama. In 2008, he gained a further M.A. (with distinction) in classical music composition. In 2026 he released 'Ghost Piano', an album of solo piano music.

=== Musical style ===
Virgo has stated that his top musical influences are John Barry, Burt Bacharach and Phil Spector. These influences are evident in the songs on Formica Blues, which Virgo has characterized as being inspired by the most-played music in his record collection. For example, "Life in Mono" samples harpsichords from Barry's soundtrack to The Ipcress File, and "High Life" pays homage to the sound of the girl groups Spector produced in the 1960s.

The music of early 20th-century classical music composers has also been identified as samples in the song "Hello Cleveland!"; in particular, the presence of pieces by Anton Webern, Arnold Schoenberg, and Alban Berg, the principal members of the Second Viennese School, supports Virgo's citation of the group (as well as their Klangfarbenmelodie technique) as among his influences. The opening chords of "Hello Cleveland!" are a sample of the opening chords of Keith Jarrett's "17 October 1988" from his Paris Concert CD.

== Discography ==
Mono's entire discography consists of the Formica Blues album, two releases of the "Life in Mono" single, further UK singles "Silicone", "Slimcea Girl" and "High Life", and the song "Madhouse", released only on the soundtrack to the 1998 film version of Psycho.

A score of remixers were commissioned on their four single releases; aside from the Propellerheads, the more notable of these include Stuart Price (in an early appearance as Les Rythmes Digitales), Mr. Scruff, Matthew Herbert, Jóhann Jóhannsson (under the alias Lhooq), and 187 Lockdown.

== Tour ==
In 1997, Mono played a few shows across the United Kingdom and France.

- 11 August: La Cigale, Paris
- 8 September: Cafe Blue, Bristol
- 9 September: The Cobden, London
- 10 September: Dry 201, Manchester
- 11 September: Bargo, Glasgow

The Independent, in a review of the Cafe Blue show (attributing it as the group's "debut gig") questioned the choice of location but gave a positive response.

In 1998, the band embarked on its only tour, twenty-one dates divided between North America and Europe while skipping the UK altogether. Following the tour's conclusion, the band were to return to the United States to join the lineup of the 1998 Lilith Fair. They were scheduled to play the following seven dates (reportedly cancelled):

- 28 June: Blockbuster Desert Sky Pavilion, Phoenix
- 29 June: New Mexico Festival, Albuquerque
- 1 July: All Sports Stadium, Oklahoma City
- 2 July: Sandstone Amphitheater, Bonner Springs
- 4 July: Deer Creek Music Center, Noblesville
- 5 July: Polaris Amphitheater, Columbus
- 6 July: Pine Knob Music Theater, Detroit

== Reception ==
Mono's success was largely centered in the United States, countered by their relative obscurity in the United Kingdom. When interviewed by Rolling Stone just prior to their first U.S. concert, the band remarked on the lack of a promotional campaign in the UK, and the relative longevity of charting records in the U.S. in comparison; still, "Life in Mono" failed to chart highly on either country's national singles chart, reaching #70 on the Billboard Hot 100 and #60 on the UK singles chart on its second release.

Two other singles peaked outside the top 100 in the UK. "Slimcea Girl" peaked at #145 in October 1997, and "High Life" peaked at #101 in July 1998 (#91 on the compressed chart with exclusions below #75). The "Formica Blues" album peaked at #71 in the UK in August 1998.

In Australia, "Silicone" peaked at #222 in 1997, and "Life in Mono" peaked at #83 in 1998 on the ARIA Singles Chart. The "Formica Blues" album peaked at #149 in Australia.

=== Comparisons ===
In making comparisons to other popular artists of the late 1990s, Al Muzer, in Consumable Online, commends the band's music for being more sophisticated than chart-topping acts such as the Spice Girls and Hanson; other reviewers, such as Spin's Jeff Salamon, take a more critical stance in noting the preponderance of bands with similar influences—period film scores and orchestrated pop, overlaid with beats—in the wake of Portishead, and criticize Mono for playing "by-the-numbers" in a combined review with Alpha's ComeFromHeaven, which is rated above Formica Blues for its more varied musical approaches. Several other critics make a note of Mono's relationship to this body of artists—characterized by AllMusic as "mid-'90s male instrumentalist/female singer duos" and The Independent as "that very Nineties pairing of the shady back-room knob-twiddler and the photogenic chanteuse".

Still others felt that Mono stood out from this group (suggested as a "case of bad timing" by Melody Maker, which nevertheless published a very favourable review of Formica Blues): those with this opinion, such as Chaos Digizine, tended to compare the band more to Saint Etienne, to illustrate their successful "weaving together musical elements of the past and present". In turn, a certain selection of pop singers and composers from the 1960s were frequently associated with Mono as well. The London music newspaper Echoes summarizes: "John Barry, Juliette Gréco, Françoise Hardy... Astrud Gilberto... Jerry Goldsmith, Jane Birkin, Brigitte Bardot, Avengers, Simone, Albert...", concluding with references to period television, fashion, and the leading figures of existentialism.

In this, the band found approval with critics who appreciated their faithfulness to the music of the era: Toronto's Eye Weekly said that "unlike many of their contemporaries, they have a reverence for properly constructed songs", and similarly, Charles Taylor, in The Boston Phoenix, remarked that "What distinguishes the album from a shopping list of mid-'60s cool is the enormous affection de Maré and Virgo conjure up for the period they invoke. It's the lack of irony or distance in that affection that are the key to understanding this band."
