= Pepper: Remixes & Rarities =

Compilation album by Alpha
- Released: 25 August 1998
- Genre: Trip hop, downtempo
- Length: 44:22
- Label: Melankolic, Virgin
- Producer: Alpha

Alpha chronology
| Come from Heaven (1997) | Pepper: Remixes & Rarities (1998) | The Impossible Thrill (2001) |

Professional ratings
Review scores
| Source | Rating |
|---|---|
| AllMusic | 3/5 stars |

Pepper: Remixes & Rarities is a 1998 compilation album by Alpha. It includes remixes of 5 tracks from their debut album, Come from Heaven, with 3 additional tracks.

== Track listing ==
| No. | Title | Writer(s) | Length |
|---|---|---|---|
| 1. | "With (Underdog Remix)" | Corin Dingley, Andy Jenks, Helen White, Fred Brathwaite | 4:43 |
| 2. | "Hazeldub (More Rockers Peace and Love Mix)" | Dingley, Jenks | 7:02 |
| 3. | "Honey" | Dingley, Jenks | 6:00 |
| 4. | "Sometime Later (Theme)" | Dingley, Jenks | 7:02 |
| 5. | "Slim (Underdog Remix)" | Dingley, Jenks, White | 5:12 |
| 6. | "Firefly (Receiver Mix)" | Dingley, Jenks, Martin Barnard | 6:15 |
| 7. | "Pepper (1995)" | Dingley, Jenks | 3:15 |
| 8. | "Over" | Dingley, Jenks | 4:53 |

Sample

- "Down By Law" by Fab Five Freddy and Chris Stein on With (Underdog Remix)

== Personnel ==
Credits adapted from liner notes.

- Alpha – production (3, 7, 8)
- Martin Barnard – vocals (6)
- Lewis Parker – vocals (1)
- Helen White – vocals (1, 5)
- More Rockers – remix (2)
- Receiver – remix (6)
- Tim Simenon – additional production, remix (4)
- Underdog – additional production, remix (1, 5)
