= Jon Bausor =

British costume designer

- Occupation: Costume designer

Jon Bausor is an international stage and costume designer for Theatre, Dance and Opera. Based in London, he is an associate artist of the Royal Shakespeare Company and designed the opening ceremony of the 2012 Paralympic Games.

== Education ==
Bausor (rhymes with "Chaucer") studied cello and voice at the Royal Academy of Music whilst attending Warwick School as a choral scholar. Whilst still at school he joined the Royal Shakespeare Company to play Lucius, in Steven Pimlott's production of Julius Caesar starring Robert Stephens. Following an Art foundation course at Exeter College of Art, where he sang as a clerk in the Cathedral choir, Bausor went on to study Music as a choral scholar at New College, Oxford under the directorship of Edward Higginbottom before training on the Motley Theatre Design Course under Alison Chitty.

== Career ==
On completing the course, Bausor was a finalist in the Linbury Prize for Stage Design, on the committee of which he now sits, and went on to design shows in many of London's fringe theatres, including the Arcola and Southwark Playhouse, as well as designing numerous projects with the director William Gaskill.

Since then Bausor has designed extensively in dance, opera and theatre for companies worldwide including The Royal Opera House, Royal National Theatre, Abbey Theatre, Dublin, Young Vic, Rambert, Royal Court Theatre, Théâtre de Complicité and both Finnish and Norwegian National Ballets. He has made regular collaborations with directors including Liam Scarlett, Cathy Marston, Will Tuckett, David Farr, David Lan, Sean Holmes, Simon Godwin, Tim Sheader, Matthew Dunster, Walter Sutcliffe, Adrian Osmond, Doug Varone, Andrea Miller and Arthur Pita. Notable designs include an immersive submarine space for KURSK at the Young Vic, a crashed plane for Lord of the Flies at the Regents Park Open Air Theatre, Ghost Stories (Duke of Yorks/ Arts Theatre, London), and a 2 km long set for MAMETZ for the National Theatre of Wales for which he won the UK Theatre Award for Best Design

As an associate artist of the RSC he has designed numerous productions including Shakespeare's Hamlet, King Lear and The Winter’s Tale, Harold Pinter's Homecoming and the entire 2012 What Country Friends Is This? season.

In 2012, Bausor designed the Opening Ceremony of the Paralympic Games in London, directed by Jenny Sealey and Bradley Hemmings, and in 2014 was commissioned to create a kinetic sculpture at the Stoke Mandeville stadium to light the flame for the 2014 Paralympic Winter Games in Sochi.

In 2014 he designed the Great North Run Millionth Runner ceremony on the Tyne River in Newcastle, and The James Plays trilogy, a joint production between the National Theatre of Scotland, Edinburgh International Festival and National Theatre of Great Britain, written by Rona Munro and directed by Laurie Sansom.
