= Kursk (play) =

Kursk is a play by the British playwright Bryony Lavery, first performed in 2009. It is inspired by the 2000 sinking of the Russian submarine K-141 Kursk from explosions of its own torpedoes during a major naval exercise. The play is set on a British submarine on a covert mission in the Barents Sea at this time.

== Production history ==
Kursk's first run was at the Young Vic in London in 2009; it had a second run at the same theatre in 2010. The play was directed by Mark Espiner and Dan Jones for the theatre company Sound & Fury. It featured set design by Jon Bausor and starred Tom Espiner and Laurence Mitchell. A split-level set, which the audience were free to walk around, was designed for the play. It was also performed at the Drill Hall in Edinburgh in 2009 at the festival and at the Sydney Opera House in 2011.

== Background ==
The Kursk, a nuclear submarine, sank in the Barents Sea during a Northern Fleet training exercise in 2000 that involved more than 30 ships. Kursk suffered an accidental explosion, fire and detonation of torpedoes, killing all 118 sailors and officers on board. In order to recreate the experiences of submariners, the directors visited HMNB Devonport, spoke to naval advisers, and spent time on an attack submarine.

== Overview ==
Kursk tells the story of the sinking of the Kursk from the perspective of the crew of a nearby British submarine. When they hear the explosion of the Kursk on their instruments, the captain of the British vessel is faced with a decision as to whether to go to the Russian ship's aid.

The play addresses the question of what would have happened had a British submarine been watching the Kursk, whether its crew would have intervened quickly enough to save some of the twenty-odd crew who survived a few hours, and the accompanying ethical and political dilemmas. In the event, the Russians refused foreign offers of aid for days.

== Critical reception ==
In 2009 Rafael Behr of The Observer wrote that "At times the plot risks submersion in the sound effects and naval jargon, but there is enough emotional engagement to navigate the drama through all the periscope-swivelling simulation." Michael Coveney of The Independent rated the play four stars and praised its recreation of the work of the submariners.

Fiona Mountford of the Evening Standard praised Kursk in March 2010, writing that Lavery, Espiner and Jones "do so much right that it’s hard to know where to start." Mountford praised the writer and directors' research, the play's sound design, and "the human angle, the sense of frustration and camaraderie as these men try to carve out fragments of personal lives". Sam Marlowe of The Times also praised the 2010 production, which he described as "thrilling and, thanks to the sensitivity of Lavery's script and the production's deft pacing, deeply affecting and thoughtful too." Lyn Gardner of The Guardian, described Kursk as "a remarkable piece of theatre" and praised its "immersive" approach. In 2011 Jason Blake of The Sydney Morning Herald wrote that "Kursk's blending of humour and sentiment, with Dan Jones's masterly sound design and convincing technical detail, makes for an enjoyable, rather than deeply involving, ride."

== Awards ==
Jon Bausor was nominated for an Evening Standard Theatre Award for Best Design in November 2009 for his work on Kursk. The production was nominated for "Best Touring Production" at the 2010 TMA Awards.

Dan Jones won the first ever Special Award for Excellence in Sound Design given by International Jury of the Prague Quadrennial 2011 for his work on Kursk. The award was given jointly to Katherine Sandys for her work Hush House.
