= Lost in a Garden of Clouds =

Studio album series by Alpha
- Released: 2004 (Part 1); 2006 (Part 2)
- Genre: Trip hop, downtempo
- Length: 45:37 (Part 1); 54:09 (Part 2)
- Label: Don't Touch Recordings
- Producer: Alpha

Alpha chronology
Stargazing (2003)	Lost in a Garden of Clouds (2004)	Without Some Help (2006)

Professional ratings
Review scores
Source	Rating
AllMusic	4/5 stars
properlychilled.com	(?)
threedworld.com.au	5/5 stars

Lost in a Garden of Clouds is a series of albums by Alpha. Part 1 was released in 2004 and Part 2 was released in 2006. Each album is a continuous mix of instrumental work from Alpha. Alpha's official website described it as "an endless journey from reality, pure art-house, a mix of song, spoken word and recurring themes."

== Track listing ==
Lost in a Garden of Clouds: Part 1
No.	Title	Length
1.	"Intro Theme"	0:56
2.	"1900"	1:10
3.	"Motor City"	2:25
4.	"Theme 2"	0:41
5.	"Familiar Demons"	3:31
6.	"Reunion"	1:04
7.	"Hopper"	1:11
8.	"In Between"	0:47
9.	"Means to an End"	4:04
10.	"Sterile"	2:44
11.	"Keep Fit"	2:00
12.	"Your Eyes Have Loved"	2:10
13.	"Monophonic"	4:12
14.	"Violet Skeleton"	3:14
15.	"Predictable World"	0:46
16.	"Hope Goes Blind"	3:51
17.	"Reprise"	1:23
18.	"Hang On"	3:00
19.	"Song of Silence"	7:18
20.	"End Theme"	2:27

Lost in a Garden of Clouds: Part 2
No.	Title	Length
1.	"Theme"	1:56
2.	"You Know"	1:25
3.	"Last Night"	4:39
4.	"Elevator"	6:02
5.	"Hooper"	3:57
6.	"Terrify"	2:16
7.	"Pike"	4:32
8.	"Could Have Missed It"	2:20
9.	"Things You Might Do 2"	4:29
10.	"Castlefranc"	4:26
11.	"Ranch"	1:38
12.	"Rum"	6:39
13.	"Watergate"	2:29
14.	"To the Sea"	4:12
15.	"Backward"	4:55
16.	"Theme (Part 2)"	1:34
