= Without Some Help =

- Without Some Help. Net Edition cover

Compilation album by Alpha
- Released: 7 August 2006
- Genre: Trip hop, downtempo
- Length: 48:13
- Label: Don't Touch Recordings
- Producer: Alpha

Alpha chronology
| Lost in a Garden of Clouds: Part 2 (2006) | Without Some Help (2006) | The Sky Is Mine (2007) |

Without Some Help is a 2006 compilation album by Alpha. It consists of 8 songs by other artists, which were remixed by Alpha, and 4 collaborations between Alpha and guest vocalists.

== Background ==
A download-only, 11-track version, Without Some Help. Net Edition, was also made available from Alpha's website. The download-only version differs from the general release by the exclusion of "Yellow" by Coldplay, "Inertia Creeps" by Massive Attack, "Jack" by Edition (all remixed by Alpha) and the inclusion of an original Alpha track, "Ariel."

== Track listing ==
| No. | Title | Artist(s) | Length |
|---|---|---|---|
| 1. | "Wot Da Fuk (Alpha Remix)" | Receiver | 3:45 |
| 2. | "The Way You Are" | Alpha featuring The Heavy | 3:18 |
| 3. | "Yellow (Alpha Remix)" | Coldplay | 4:26 |
| 4. | "Hope Goes Blind" | Alpha featuring James Roberts | 3:05 |
| 5. | "Bowl Me Over (Alpha Remix)" | Acid Casuals | 3:15 |
| 6. | "Two Fazed People (Alpha Remix)" | Horace Andy | 4:46 |
| 7. | "This Is Where I Came In" | Alpha featuring Jarvis Cocker | 3:24 |
| 8. | "Song to the Siren" | Alpha featuring Wendy Stubbs | 5:00 |
| 9. | "LE-465 (Alpha Remix)" | Blueneck | 4:25 |
| 10. | "Inertia Creeps (Alpha Remix)" | Massive Attack | 6:10 |
| 11. | "Make My Day (Alpha Remix)" | Horace Andy | 4:48 |
| 12. | "Yeah So (Alpha Remix)" | James Roberts | 3:51 |
