= Søren (band) =

Italian band

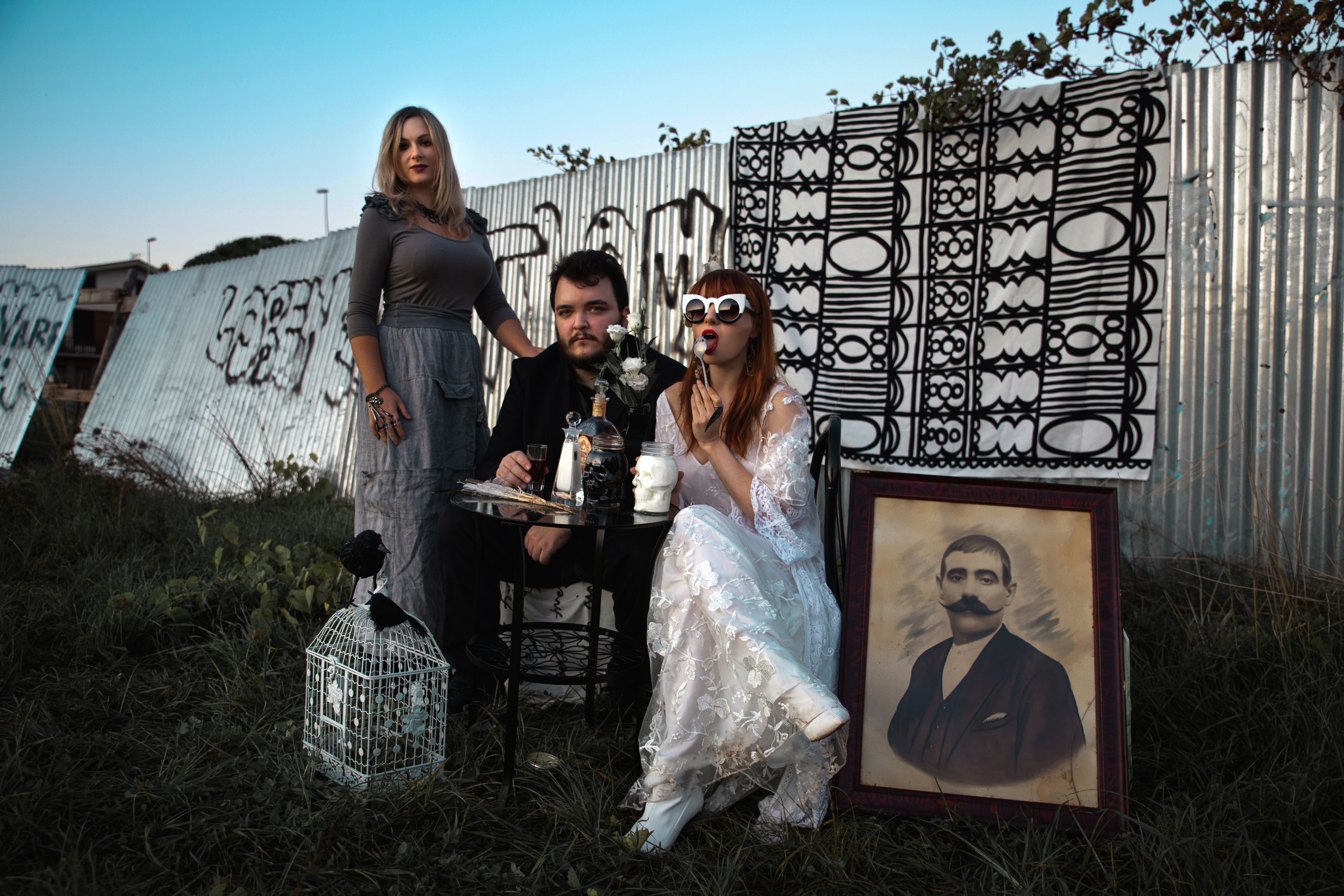

Background information
- Origin: Rome, Italy
- Genres: Dark folk New Wave; Gothic Rock
- Years active: 2013-2021
- Labels: Seahorse Recordings, Audioglobe (2017-2018); Lost Generation Records (2019-)
- Members: Matteo Gagliardi; Diana D'Ascenzo
- Past members: Giulia Cianca; Flaminia Capitani; Danilo "ZooT" Marianelli; Andrea Aloisi

Søren is an Italian dark folk/new wave collective formed in 2013 by Matteo Gagliardi that employs musicians from all over the world. In 2017 they released their debut album Stargazing, quickly followed by a video single for the song Houses and a companion ep recorded live in 2018 titled Stargazing Live!. In April 2020 they released Bedtime Rituals, their second studio album, followed in November 2021 by Ultima Necat, their third and last work. Their name is a tribute to the danish philosopher Søren Kierkegaard.

== Style ==
Søren are often described as a cocktail of Dark Folk and New Wave and are usually compared to other Neofolk acts from Rome like Spiritual Front, but with more new wave influences. Other reviewers compared them to acts like My Bloody Valentine, Daughter and The XX and described them as electro-folk. Their songs are often described as "dark ballads", and they use a mix of almost-whispered male and strong female vocals. Their second album Bedtime Rituals was compared to the gothic rock sound of The Sisters of Mercy, with epic and symphonic influences, almost fantasy-like.

== Collaborations ==
Stargazing and Bedtime Rituals, Søren's first two albums, are very collaborative works with more than ten musicians across the world working on them coming from different backgrounds and musical genres, from the singer-songwriter world of Joni Fuller and Mike Wyatt to the punk attitude of guitarist Matt LeFevers and the metal background of drummer Siros Vaziri.

=== Album covers ===
The cover art of Stargazing was digitally painted by Daniele Piscitello, lead animator of the videogame The Wardrobe. The same cover was edited by filmmaker Antonio La Camera, also director of the Houses music video and award winner with his short Flesh and Dust, to be used for Stargazing Live!. Bedtime Rituals, Søren second studio album, features a cover painted by Martyna "Outstar" Zych, animator on The Witcher 3, lead designer of Cold Hearts and twitch streamer. Works on the cover was live-streamed on twitch and now it is featured on the band official YouTube channel.

== Lineup ==
=== Official members ===
- Matteo Gagliardi – vocals, keyboards, drum programming (2013–2021)
- Diana D'Ascenzo - vocals, guitars (2013–2017, 2019–2021)

=== Former members ===
- Giulia Cianca - vocals (2013–2017)
- Flaminia Capitani – vocals, rhythmic guitar (2017–2019)
- Danilo "ZooT" Marianelli - guitars (2018)
- Andrea Aloisi - percussions (2018–2019)

=== Recurring studio members ===
- Joni Fuller – violin, viola, cello (2013–2020)
- Fabio Fraschini - bass guitar (2020-2021)
- Lorenzo Tarquini - guitars, bass guitar (2019–2020)
- Danilo "ZooT" Marianelli - guitars (2019)
- Andrea Aloisi - percussions (2019)
- Glenn Welman – drums (2018)

== Discography ==
=== Full-length albums ===
- Stargazing (2017)
- Bedtime Rituals (2020)
- Ultima Necat (2021)

=== Other releases ===
- Stargazing Live! (Live EP, 2018)
- Mantra/Mantra RMX (Digital Single, 2020)
- Pain of Love (Digital Single, 2020)
- Unreal City (radio edit) (Digital Single, 2020)
- La Stanza dell'Alchimia (feat. Lorenzo Tarquini, Fabio Fraschini) in Suspended (Compilation album, 2020)
- La Stanza dell'Alchimia (feat. Lorenzo Tarquini, Fabio Fraschini) (Bandcamp Digital Single, 2020)
- Mantra - Max Varani RMX (feat. Nina Orlandi) (Bandcamp Digital Single, 2020)
