= Mind the Gap (Tristan Psionic album) =

Studio album by Tristan Psionic
- Released: 18 April 2000
- Recorded: January – February 2000; The Gas Station Recording Studio
- Genre: Indie rock
- Length: 47:21
- Label: Sonic Unyon
- Producer: Ian Blurton

Tristan Psionic chronology
TPA Flight 028 (1996)	Mind the Gap (2000)

Professional ratings
Review scores
Source	Rating
Allmusic	link

Mind the Gap is the third (and last) album by Canadian indie rock group Tristan Psionic. It was released in 2000 on Sonic Unyon, a record label started by three members of the band.

The album was produced by Ian Blurton and engineered by Dale Morningstar at The Gas Station in Toronto. It ranked as the number two album of 2000 for Canadian college radio.

== Track listing ==
All songs written by Tristan Psionic (Rob Higgins / Sandy McIntosh / Mark Milne / Tim Potocic) except where noted.

1. "Promise" – 10:39
2. "Helicopter" (Tristan Psionic / April Sabucco) – 2:50
3. "Launch" (Tristan Psionic / Sabucco) – 3:32
4. "Mimico" – 1:10
5. "Red Dots" – 2:44
6. "High Time" – 3:03
7. "Longbranch" – 1:13
8. "Signs" – 3:09
9. "The Move Is Set" (Tristan Psionic / Sabucco) – 2:13
10. "Sunshinin'" – 2:56
11. "Just Off the Level" (Tristan Psionic / Sabucco) – 3:25
12. "Union Station" – 3:23
13. "Camp Morningstar" (Tristan Psionic / Sabucco) – 2:08
14. "Can't Wait Forever" – 4:56
