= Siobhan de Maré =

British singer

Siobhan de Maré is a British singer, mostly known from lending her voice to the album Formica Blues by the UK band Mono in 1997. In 2000, she joined Robin Guthrie (formerly of Cocteau Twins) to form Violet Indiana, which varies from shimmery wall of sound style with similarities to dreampop, to sparse single-guitar songs with less effects. Siobhan has a sensual, ethereal voice, and she is the fifth child of The Shadows drummer Tony Meehan.

== Albums ==
De Maré has fronted two bands so far in her career, the trip hop sounding "Mono" and guitar based "Violet Indiana". More recently she has been writing and recording with Gary Bruce under the name Swoone. The track This Bullet Never Kills was released in May 2015 with an album, Handcuffed Heart released in August 2018.

== Mono ==
- Formica Blues (1997)

== Violet Indiana ==
- Choke EP (2000)
- Special EP (2001)
- Roulette (2001)
- Killer Eyes EP (2001)
- Casino (2002) (Compilation)
- Beyond The Furr EP (2004)
- Russian Doll (2004)

== Swoone ==
- This Bullet Never Kills (Single) (2015)
- Never Let Go (2017) a track on the compilation Static Waves 6 by Saint Marie Records
- Handcuffed Heart (2018)
