= The Sounds of Tristan Psionic =

Studio album by Tristan Psionic
- Released: 1 June 1994
- Recorded: December 1993 – May 1994
- Genre: Indie rock
- Length: 32:22
- Label: Sonic Unyon

Tristan Psionic chronology
The Sounds of Tristan Psionic (1994)	TPA Flight 028 (1996)

Professional ratings
Review scores
Source	Rating
Allmusic	link

The Sounds of Tristan Psionic is the debut album by Canadian indie rock group Tristan Psionic. It was released in 1994 on Sonic Unyon, a record label started by three of the four members of the band. It was the second release, and the first full-length release, by Sonic Unyon.

== Track listing ==
All songs written by Tristan Psionic (Sandy McIntosh, Gary "Wool" McMaster, Mark Milne, and Tim Potocic).

1. "Black Psabbath Psong" – 3:10
2. "The Nightmare Returns" – 4:01
3. "25 Cents" – 2:50
4. "?Sometimes" – 2:58
5. "Pslop" – 1:25
6. "Ketchup" – 3:31
7. "Screamin' Beamin'" – 4:06
8. "Let It Go" – 4:13
9. "Transmission" – 6:13
10. "Tee Hee" – 0:01
