= Stargazing (Søren album) =

2017 studio album by Søren

Studio album by Søren
- Released: December 8, 2017
- Genre: Dark folk Electrofolk; Art folk
- Length: 29:03
- Label: Seahorse Recordings; Audioglobe; Lost Generation Records
- Producer: Matteo Gagliardi

Søren chronology
| Stargazing (2017) | Stargazing Live! (2018) |

Stargazing is the debut studio album by the Italian darkfolk band Søren, released on December 8, 2017 digitally and on December 22, 2017 as a physical record. A music video for the song "Houses" was filmed in January 2018, directed by Antonio La Camera, an Italian filmmaker.

Air is thick, my mind is black.
Sunrise? Nowhere to be seen.

— "Houses", Matteo Gagliardi

== Track listing ==
| No. | Title | Lyrics | Music | Length |
|---|---|---|---|---|
| 1. | "Reaching" | Matteo Gagliardi | | 0:06 |
| 2. | "In My Heart" | Matteo Gagliardi | Diana D'Ascenzo | 3:46 |
| 3. | "The Foolish One" | Matteo Gagliardi | Matteo Gagliardi, Diana D'Ascenzo | 3:09 |
| 4. | "Our Sky" | Matteo Gagliardi | Matteo Gagliardi | 3:35 |
| 5. | "Blood, Sweat and Tears" (Originally performed by Whispers in the shadow) | Ashley Dayour | Whispers in the shadow | 3:19 |
| 6. | "Houses" | Matteo Gagliardi | Matteo Gagliardi | 3:35 |
| 7. | "Everyday Heroes I" | | Matteo Gagliardi, Diana D'Ascenzo | 1:17 |
| 8. | "Everyday Heroes II" | Matteo Gagliardi | Matteo Gagliardi, Diana D'Ascenzo | 2:34 |
| 9. | "Stargazing" | Matteo Gagliardi | Matteo Gagliardi | 3:31 |
| 10. | "Under a Crimson Moon" | Matteo Gagliardi | Matteo Gagliardi | 4:11 |
| Total length: | | | | 29:03 |

Stargazing – 2019 digital re-release
| No. | Title | Music | Length |
|---|---|---|---|
| 11. | "In My Heart (Piano Edit - Bonus track)" | Diana D'Ascenzo | 3:52 |
| Total length: | | | 32:55 |

== Personnel ==
The personnel include :-

- Matteo Gagliardi − vocals, keyboards, drum programming
- Mark Brown - piano
- Giulia Cianca - vocals
- Diana D'Ascenzo - backing vocals
- Stephen K. Donnelly - guitars
- Joni Fuller - violin, strings, percussions
- Angelo Pagliuca Mena - tambourine and cajon
- Matt Le Fevers - guitars
- William Stewart - electric violin
- Stryfer - bass guitar
- Diego Van Cooper - drum programming
- Siros Vaziri - drums
- Mike Wyatt - guitars
- Jung Chin Yeoh - cello
- Fabio Fraschini - Mix
- Fabrizio De Carolis - Mastering

== Stargazing Live! ==
In 2018 a companion EP to Stargazing titled Stargazing Live! was released with a live recording of the band's performance at ARTEr.i.e. in Cantalupo in Sabina.

Stargazing Live!

Live album by Søren
- Released: November 14, 2018
- Genre: Dark Folk
- Length: 15:20
- Label: Seahorse Recordings; Audioglobe; Lost Generation Records
- Producer: Matteo Gagliardi

Søren chronology
| Stargazing (2017) | Stargazing Live! (2018) | Bedtime Rituals (2020) |

=== Track listing ===
| No. | Title | Lyrics | Music | Length |
|---|---|---|---|---|
| 1. | "Reaching (live)" | Matteo Gagliardi | Matteo Gagliardi | 0:16 |
| 2. | "Houses (live)" | Matteo Gagliardi | Matteo Gagliardi | 3:15 |
| 3. | "The Foolish One (live)" | Matteo Gagliardi | Matteo Gagliardi, Diana D'Ascenzo | 2:30 |
| 4. | "Our Sky (live)" | Matteo Gagliardi | Matteo Gagliardi | 3:35 |
| 5. | "Body Language (live)" | Flaminia Capitani | Flaminia Capitani | 2:10 |
| 6. | "Stargazing (live)" | Matteo Gagliardi | Matteo Gagliardi | 3:31 |
| Total length: | | | | 15:20 |

Stargazing Live! – 2019 digital re-release, Bandcamp exclusive bonus track
| No. | Title | Lyrics | Music | Length |
|---|---|---|---|---|
| 7. | "Stargazing Live! (Continuous Mix)" | Søren | Søren | 15:18 |
| Total length: | | | | 30:38 |

=== Personnel ===
The personnel include :

- Matteo Gagliardi − vocals
- Flaminia Capitani − vocals, acoustic guitar
- Andrea Aloisi - percussions
- Fabio Fraschini - mix & mastering
