= The Sky Is Mine =

Studio album by Alpha
- Released: 18 September 2007
- Genre: Trip hop, downtempo
- Length: 63:58
- Label: Don't Touch
- Producer: Corin Dingley

Alpha chronology
Without Some Help (2006)	The Sky Is Mine (2007)	Two Phazed People (2009)

Professional ratings
Review scores
Source	Rating
AllMusic	3/5 stars
Exclaim!	favorable
PopMatters	6/10 stars

The Sky Is Mine is a studio album by the English band Alpha. It was released domestically and across Europe on 18 September 2007 and released in the United States on 19 February 2008. Founding member Andy Jenks left shortly after the sessions for the album began, leaving other founding member and producer Corin Dingley, joined by long-time Alpha vocalist Wendy Stubbs and keyboardist Peter Wild, to complete the album.

== Track listing ==
No.	Title	Writer(s)	Length
1.	"Stargazing"	Corin Dingley, Wendy Stubbs	4:14
2.	"Surely"	Stubbs	5:29
3.	"Brood"	Dingley, Stubbs	5.58
4.	"Push"	Stubbs	3:50
5.	"Burn Me Again"	Stubbs	5:21
6.	"May"	Stubbs	4:08
7.	"Given Time"	Stubbs	3:51
8.	"For the Wages"	Dingley, Stubbs	6:05
9.	"Home"	Stubbs	4:13
10.	"Stumbled"	Dingley, Stubbs	5:23
11.	"Silver Bullet"	Stubbs	4:32
12.	"A Little Poison"	Stubbs	10:54
