= Great Expectations (1998 film) =

- Theatrical release poster
- Directed by: Alfonso Cuarón
- Screenplay by: Mitch Glazer
- Based on: Great Expectations; 1861 novel by Charles Dickens
- Produced by: Art Linson; John Linson
- Starring: Ethan Hawke; Gwyneth Paltrow; Hank Azaria; Chris Cooper; Anne Bancroft; Robert De Niro
- Cinematography: Emmanuel Lubezki
- Edited by: Steven Weisberg
- Music by: Patrick Doyle; Ron Wasserman
- Production company: Art Linson Productions
- Distributed by: 20th Century Fox
- Release date: January 30, 1998
- Running time: 111 minutes
- Country: United States
- Languages: English; French
- Budget: $25 million
- Box office: $55.5 million

Great Expectations is a 1998 American romantic drama film directed by Alfonso Cuarón and written by Mitch Glazer. It stars Ethan Hawke, Gwyneth Paltrow, Hank Azaria, Chris Cooper, Anne Bancroft and Robert De Niro. The film adapts Charles Dickens's 1861 novel Great Expectations, moving the setting from Victorian London to contemporary New York. The film garnered mixed reviews but managed to earn $55 million at the global box office, making it a modest financial success.

== Plot ==
Ten-year-old Finnegan "Finn" Bell—an orphan being raised by his elder sister Maggie and her boyfriend Joe—is overpowered by an escaped convict while playing on a beach on the Gulf Coast. Finn brings him food, alcohol and bolt cutters to cut the iron shackles off his legs, and is taken hostage. The convict tries to escape to Mexico, but the police see his small boat. While the convict hides on a buoy Finn drops him a floatation device and the police tow Finn back to land. Finn sees on the news that the now-recaptured convict was mobster Arthur Lustig, who had escaped from death row.

Joe is hired as the gardener at "Paradiso Perduto" ("Lost Paradise" in Italian), the mansion of the richest woman in Florida, Nora Dinsmoor, who has lived as a recluse since her fiancé left her at the altar years before. Finn accompanies Joe and encounters Dinsmoor's young niece, Estella. Dinsmoor invites Finn to come back and play with Estella. She behaves haughtily on Finn's first visit, but her aunt forces her to sit for an impromptu portrait by Finn. Dinsmoor warns Finn that he will fall in love with Estella and his heart will be broken.

Several years pass. Maggie runs away from home and Joe raises Finn alone. Finn goes to Paradiso Perduto every Saturday and develops into a talented painter. Although Estella is sporadically flirtatious, even attempting to seduce Finn at one point, she leaves to study in Europe without telling him. Heartbroken, Finn gives up painting and his visits to Paradiso Perduto.

Seven years later, a lawyer tells Finn that a gallery owner in New York City wants to show his work. Finn is perplexed but agrees to go. There, he encounters Estella in the park. She is in a relationship with Walter, a wealthy businessman. She resumes her flirtatious behavior toward Finn, posing nude for a portrait in his apartment and arousing Walter's jealousy.

Eventually, Finn, frustrated by Estella's evasiveness, lures her away from Walter and the two have sex. She tells him that she is going to visit her aunt, but will return for the opening of Finn's show. However, she fails to appear on opening night. Uncle Joe does appear, though, but Joe's usual unpolished personality now embarrasses Finn. Finn goes to Estella's home in New York hoping to find her, but he finds Ms. Dinsmoor instead, who reveals that she came to New York to attend Estella's wedding with Walter, which upsets Finn. She tells Finn that Estella was using him to make Walter jealous and convince him to marry her. When she realizes how seriously that she has upset him, she is remorseful and apologizes for her manipulation, but it is too late.

Back at his studio, Finn finds a strange man wanting to see him, and it turns out to be Lustig. Finn is incredulous at first, then uncomfortable with his presence. As Lustig leaves, his comments make Finn realize that he, not the wealthy Ms. Dinsmoor, has been Finn's benefactor during Finn's entire time in New York. Finn goes with him to the subway station.

Waiting for a train, Lustig sees three unsavory acquaintances on the opposite platform. Finn and Lustig outmaneuver them and board a train. They think they are safe, but one of them comes through the car and fatally stabs Lustig. As he bleeds to death in Finn's arms, Lustig reveals that he has been Finn's benefactor in return for the kindness Finn showed him as a child.

Devastated, Finn drops everything, goes to Paris to study art and becomes successful. He returns to Florida to visit his Uncle Joe. Ms. Dinsmoor has died, but he visits her house anyway. Sitting in the garden, he thinks that he sees an apparition of Estella as a child. Following the little girl to the back dock, he finds her mother, who turns out to be Estella, now divorced. She admits that she has often thought of him, and asks him to forgive her, which he does. They hold hands, looking out over the sea.

== Cast ==
- Ethan Hawke as Finnegan "Finn" Bell
  - Jeremy James Kissner as 10-year-old Finn
- Gwyneth Paltrow as Estella
  - Raquel Beaudene as 10-year-old Estella
- Hank Azaria as Walter Plane
- Chris Cooper as Joe Coleman
- Anne Bancroft as Ms. Nora Dinsmoor
- Robert De Niro as Arthur Lustig
- Josh Mostel as Jerry Ragno
- Kim Dickens as Maggie
- Nell Campbell as Erica Thrall
- Gabriel Mick as Owen
- Stephen Spinella as Carter Macleish

== Production ==
The movie changes the setting from 1812 to 1827 London to 1990s New York, and updates the hero's name from "Pip" to "Finn". The name of Hawke's character was undecided for a while, with the original novel's Pip sounding unpalatable, given this version's modern-day setting. The production settled on Finnegan, or Finn, the name of Hawke's dog. Other changes include the character of "Miss Havisham" renamed "Nora Dinsmoor", and "Abel Magwitch" renamed "Arthur Lustig".

Hawke was initially not interested; he felt that the themes of class present in the story would be better served in an American context if the main character were Latino or African American. However, after meeting with Cuarón and being impressed with the director's enthusiasm for the project, Hawke agreed.

The voiceovers were not in the original screenplay. Once the film was edited together, producer Art Linson felt that voiceover was needed to maintain connective tissue in the hyperstylized world that Cuaron had created. Having previously worked with screenwriter David Mamet on The Edge and The Untouchables, Linson hired him to write the voiceovers. Mamet was not credited in the final film.

=== Locations used ===
- Ca' d'Zan, a historic residence in Sarasota, Florida, was used for the exterior and parts of the interior of Paradiso Perduto. The mansion was built in 1924 by Mable and John Ringling. The façade was dressed to appear decrepit and overgrown, a gate was added to the avenue approaching the front, and the interior ballroom and loggia facing the waterfront terrace were also dressed for the dancing scenes.

=== Artwork and portraits used in the film ===
All of Finn's artwork and portraits of the main characters in the film were done by Francesco Clemente, an Italian painter. The actors sat for him in private. A gallery of some of the paintings was available for viewing at Fox's website devoted to the film.

== Soundtrack ==
On January 6, 1998, Atlantic Records released an official soundtrack album. The song "Siren" was written for this film by Tori Amos. The soundtrack also includes songs by popular artists such as Pulp, Scott Weiland, Iggy Pop, Chris Cornell and The Verve Pipe. Duncan Sheik's contribution, the song "Wishful Thinking", was released as a single from the soundtrack, and Poe's "Today" was released as a promo. The film's score was written by Scottish composer Patrick Doyle, a veteran of many literary adaptations and frequent collaborator of Kenneth Branagh, and featured classical guitarist John Williams.

Several variations of the song "Bésame Mucho" are heard throughout the film. The primary recording and the version released on the soundtrack, however, is performed by Cesária Évora.

The soundtrack also features the breakthrough single "Life in Mono", which became a hit, charting on the Billboard Hot 100. The song "Breakable" by Fisher (consisting of television composer Ron Wasserman and his wife Kathy Fisher) was popular on internet file sharing sites, which helped the duo get signed to Interscope Records in 2000.

The score track "Kissing in the Rain" was interpolated in the song "RoboCop" on Kanye West's 2008 album 808s & Heartbreak.

=== Album track listing ===
1. Finn (Intro) - Instrumental Vocalization by Tori Amos
2. Siren - Performed by Tori Amos
3. Life in Mono - Performed by Mono
4. Sunshower - Performed by Chris Cornell
5. Resignation - Performed by Reef
6. Like a Friend - Performed by Pulp
7. Wishful Thinking - Performed by Duncan Sheik
8. Today - Performed by Poe
9. Lady, Your Roof Brings Me Down - Performed by Scott Weiland
10. Her Ornament - Performed by the Verve Pipe
11. Walk This Earth Alone - Performed by Lauren Christy
12. Breakable - Performed by Fisher
13. Success - Performed by Iggy Pop
14. Slave - Performed by David Garza
15. Uncle John's Band - Performed by the Grateful Dead
16. Besame Mucho - Performed by Cesária Évora

== Novelization ==
A novelization of the film was written by Deborah Chiel, and published by St. Martin's Press.

== Reception ==
Great Expectations received mixed or average reviews. Rotten Tomatoes gives the film a score of 41% based on 37 reviews, with an average rating of 5.7/10. The site's consensus states: "Great Expectations is all surface tension: beautiful people shot in beautiful locations without any depth or emotion." Based on 24 critic reviews from mainstream publications, Metacritic assigned the film a weighted average score of 55 out of 100, based on reviews from 24 critics. Audiences polled by CinemaScore gave the film an average grade of "B–" on a scale of A+ to F.

Film critic Roger Ebert of the Chicago Sun-Times, giving it three stars out of four, wrote: "Great Expectations begins as a great movie (I was spellbound by the first 30 minutes), but ends as only a good one, and I think that's because the screenplay, by Mitch Glazer, too closely follows the romantic line."

Ethan Hawke commented on the film's release that it had the bad fortune to overlap with the release of Titanic, which premiered in theaters six weeks before Great Expectations. He stated that "nobody gave a shit about anything but Titanic for about 9 months after...particularly another romance".

In 2016, in a discussion about their collaborations at the Tribeca Film Festival, Cuarón and cinematographer Emmanuel Lubezki both stated their dissatisfaction with the film. Cuarón called it "a complete failed film", while Lubezki said that it was "the least satisfying of our movies."

== Home media and rights ==
In the United States, 20th Century Fox Home Entertainment released the film on VHS on July 21, 1998, with a LaserDisc following on August 26, 1998. In 1998, it was released on LaserDisc in Hong Kong, with a Japanese LaserDisc also being released on February 5, 1999. The film was released on DVD in the US (Region 1) on January 18, 2000, later being reissued on January 12, 2010, with this reissue having no nudity on the cover like the original release. The UK (Region 2) DVD was originally released in 2001, with the UK DVD being reissued in 2013 with the new 2010 artwork. In Australia (Region 4), 20th Century Fox Home Entertainment South Pacific released it together on a double feature DVD with The Crucible (1996), another Fox film. This double feature was released on October 4, 2006. The following year, 20th Century Fox Home Entertainment South Pacific also released it on another double feature DVD with A Midsummer Night's Dream (1999).

On March 20, 2019, Rupert Murdoch sold most of 21st Century Fox's film and television assets to The Walt Disney Company, and Great Expectations was one of the films included in the deal. Fox released the film on Blu-ray in Japan on February 8, 2019, a month before the Disney sale was finalized. Disney has not released any further home video products for the film since acquiring the rights.
