= Stargazing (Alpha album) =

Studio album by Alpha
- Released: 12 May 2003
- Genre: Trip hop, downtempo
- Length: 53:08
- Label: Don't Touch
- Producer: Corin Dingley, Andy Jenks

Alpha chronology
The Impossible Thrill (2001)	Stargazing (2003)	Lost in a Garden of Clouds: Part 1 (2004)

Stargazing is a studio album by Alpha. It was released on Don't Touch in 2003. It includes vocal contributions from Wendy Stubbs, Helen White, Martin Barnard, and Kelvin Swaybe.

In 2004, a special edition CD was released on Nettwerk Records with a different track listing.

== Critical reception ==
Professional ratings
Review scores
Source	Rating
AllMusic	4.5/5 stars

Tim DiGravina of AllMusic said: "While some of the group's contemporaries were releasing somewhat blundering, meandering albums, Alpha hit the ball out of the park with Stargazing and redefined intelligent and passionate electronic soul music." John Bergstrom of PopMatters called it "peaceful, intense and ultimately inspiring."

== Track listing ==
Original edition (2003)
No.	Title	Writer(s)	Length
1.	"Sleepdust"	Corin Dingley, Andy Jenks	1:36
2.	"Once Round Town"	Dingley, Jenks, Wendy Stubbs	3:01
3.	"Lipstick from the Asylum"	Martin Barnard, Dingley, Jenks	3:52
4.	"A Perfect End"	Dingley, Jenks, Helen White	4:08
5.	"Elvis"	Dingley, Jenks, Kelvin Swaby	3:23
6.	"As Far as You Can"	Dingley, Jenks	3:30
7.	"Saturn in Rain"	Barnard, Dingley, Jenks	4:43
8.	"Waiting"	Dingley, Jenks, White	3:52
9.	"Silver Light"	Dingley, Jenks, Stubbs	4:11
10.	"I Just Wanna Make You"	Dingley, Jenks, Swaby	3:51
11.	"Vers Toi"	Dingley, Jenks	3:48
12.	"Double View"	Dingley, Jenks, Stubbs	2:56
13.	"Blue Autumn"	Dingley, Jenks, White	4:50
14.	"Portable Living Room"	Barnard, Dingley, Jenks	4:01

Special edition CD (2004)
No.	Title	Writer(s)	Length
1.	"Sleepdust"	Dingley, Jenks	1:36
2.	"Once Round Town"	Dingley, Jenks, Stubbs	3:01
3.	"The Things You Might"	Dingley, Jenks	2:47
4.	"Lipstick from the Asylum"	Barnard, Dingley, Jenks	3:52
5.	"Elvis"	Dingley, Jenks, Swaby	3:23
6.	"As Far as You Can"	Dingley, Jenks	3:30
7.	"Horseshit"	Dingley, Jenks	4:22
8.	"Saturn in Rain"	Barnard, Dingley, Jenks	4:43
9.	"Silver Light"	Dingley, Jenks, Stubbs	4:11
10.	"Roy"	Dingley, Jenks	3:17
11.	"I Just Wanna Make You"	Dingley, Jenks, Swaby	3:51
12.	"Blue Autumn"	Dingley, Jenks, White	4:50
13.	"Vers Toi"	Dingley, Jenks	3:48
14.	"Portable Living Room"	Barnard, Dingley, Jenks	4:04
15.	"A Perfect End"	Dingley, Jenks, White	4:08

== Personnel ==
Credits adapted from the original edition's liner notes.

- Corin Dingley – production, mixing
- Andy Jenks – production, mixing, artwork
- Wendy Stubbs – vocals (2, 9, 12)
- Martin Barnard – vocals (3, 7, 14)
- Helen White – vocals (4, 8, 13), photography
- Kelvin Swaybe – vocals (5, 10)
- Pete Wild – piano (5, 12)
- Joe Allen – bass guitar (5, 12)
- Bob Locke – bass guitar (9)
- John Dent – mastering

== Charts ==
Chart	Peak position
French Albums (SNEP)	80
