= Tristan Psionic =

Hamilton, Ontario indie rock band active 1991–2010

- Origin: Hamilton, Ontario, Canada
- Genres: Indie rock
- Years active: 1991–2000
- Label: Sonic Unyon
- Past members: Sandy McIntosh; Mark Milne; Tim Potocic; Rob Higgins; April Sabucco; Peter Kirkpatrick; Gary "Wool" McMaster; Doug Lea

Tristan Psionic was a Canadian indie rock band. The band members also founded the music label Sonic Unyon.

== History ==
Triston Psionic was formed in 1991 in an industrial warehouse loft in Hamilton, Ontario. The band consisted of vocalist Sandy McIntosh, guitarist Mark Milne, bassist Peter Lemmond and then Gary "Wool" McMaster and Wet Spots drummer Doug Lea. The band was named after Peter's dog. This lineup recorded a cassette, Psix Psong Demo.

Tim Potocic replaced Doug on drums in 1993. The band formed its own label, Sonic Unyon Records, to release its albums; their first album was The Sounds of Tristan Psionic. and developed the imprint into one of Canada's largest independent labels.

After Wool's departure, Heimlich Maneuver bassist Peter Kirkpatrick was enlisted to help write and record TPA Flight 028 and was replaced by April Sabucco shortly thereafter. Sabucco was in turn replaced by Rob Higgins on the band's final release, Mind the Gap.

== Discography ==
- Psix Psong Demo (Indie Cassette, 1992)
- The Sounds of Tristan Psionic (Sonic Unyon, 1994)
- TPA Flight 028 (Sonic Unyon, 1996)
- Mind the Gap (Sonic Unyon, 2000)

=== Other releases ===
- The Allied Nations Victory (Sonic Unyon, 1999), split 7-inch with Primrods
