= The Impossible Thrill =

Studio album by Alpha
- Released: 20 March 2001
- Studio: Alpha Studios, Clevedon; Abbey Road Studios, London; Gas Works, Bristol
- Genre: Trip hop, downtempo
- Length: 49:05
- Label: Melankolic, Virgin
- Producer: Corin Dingley, Andy Jenks

Alpha chronology
Pepper: Remixes & Rarities (1998)	The Impossible Thrill (2001)	Stargazing (2003)

Professional ratings
Aggregate scores
Source	Rating
Metacritic	64/100
Review scores
Source	Rating
AllMusic	3/5 stars
Hot Press	favorable
Pitchfork	3.0/10
PopMatters	favorable
Portland Mercury	3.5/4 stars

The Impossible Thrill is a studio album by Alpha. It was released on Melankolic in 2001. It includes vocal contributions from Martin Barnard, Wendy Stubbs, and Helen White.

== Critical reception ==
At Metacritic, which assigns a weighted average score out of 100 to reviews from mainstream critics, the album received an average score of 64% based on 7 reviews, indicating "generally favorable reviews".

Aidin Vaziri of Rolling Stone included it on the "Top Albums of 2001" list.

== Track listing ==
No.	Title	Writer(s)	Length
1.	"Still"	Corin Dingley, Andy Jenks, Helen White	4:07
2.	"Eon"	Dingley, Jenks, Wendy Stubbs	3:49
3.	"Dim"	Martin Barnard, Dingley, Jenks	4:57
4.	"South"	Dingley, Jenks, White	3:42
5.	"Almost There"	Dingley, Jenks, Stubbs, White, Doris, McKuen, Rota	4:36
6.	"Wise"	Barnard, Dingley, Jenks	6:33
7.	"Especial"	Dingley, Jenks	5:26
8.	"Wishes"	Dingley, Jenks, Stubbs	3:29
9.	"Clear Sky"	Barnard, Dingley, Jenks	5:20
10.	"Al Sation"	Dingley, Jenks, Stubbs	3:22
11.	"Fort"	Dingley, Jenks, White	5:44

Japanese edition bonus tracks
No.	Title	Length
12.	"Sea"	3:50
13.	"Don't Touch"	4:18

Sample

- "Blues" by Nino Rota on Almost There

== Personnel ==
Credits adapted from liner notes.

- Corin Dingley – production, arrangement, mixing
- Andy Jenks – production, arrangement, photography
- Helen White – vocals (1, 4, 5, 11)
- Wendy Stubbs – vocals (2, 5, 8, 10)
- Martin Barnard – vocals (3, 6, 9)
- Grant Marshall – vocals (8)
- Sean Cook – harmonica
- Pete Wilde – piano
- Alex Lee – guitar
- Bob Locke – bass guitar
- Naked Voices – choir
- Allison Orbaum – choir arrangement
- Daniel Jones – orchestra arrangement
- Paul Hicks – orchestra engineering
- Chris Clark – orchestra engineering assistance
- Gavin Wright – strings conducting
- John Dent – mastering
- Emma Poole – art supervision
- Elissa Noad – layout
- Stephen Gill – photography
- Donald Milne – photography

== Charts ==
Chart	Peak position
French Albums (SNEP)	45
