= Cactus Club (San Jose) =

Defunct nightclub of San Francisco, California

Coordinates: 37.3296°N 121.8859°W

The Cactus Club was a nightclub in the South of First Area (SoFA) of Downtown San Jose, California. It was one of the first clubs to replace some of the 'red light' businesses on South First Street (across the street was the Pussycat Theater which later became F/X). The Cactus Club took over The Bachelor Club and went on to become a legendary live music venue in San Jose for close to 15 years. The concept of The Cactus Club was created by Sean Galvin and Mike Trippett. It was Producer/Promoter Ric Hines who made the opening of the Cactus Club possible with his business experience and professional network. Hines was introduced to lawyer partner Bob Cullen by Erik Foss, Lead Singer of Never Say Never whom Hines managed. That introduction was the lynchpin that financially pulled that venture together. Bob's nickname "Cactus Bob" was used to name the club. Mike's brother Calvin Trippett was brought in later as the booking agent for the club. The Cactus Club opened in 1988 and remained open until 2002.

Emphasizing music, the club featured many local and national touring acts as well as themed dance nights.

Among the San Francisco Bay Area bands that got some of their start from playing the Cactus Club are Terror Toys, No Use For A Name, Smash Mouth, The Donnas, Papa Roach, Insolence, Green Day, Alien Ant Farm, Carbonation, The Chop Tops, Concerning Eye, Sloe, and The Odd Numbers. The Cactus is often noted as being one of the first clubs in the Bay Area to attempt an end of pay-to-play practices that Bay Area clubs had been doing for a long time.

Major touring acts such as Nirvana, Red Hot Chili Peppers, Korn, Queens of the Stone Age, Deftones, MC Hammer, Pigeon Project, Dropkick Murphys, Flogging Molly, Alanis Morissette, Mother Love Bone, Incubus, System of a Down, A Perfect Circle, Rage Against the Machine and Weezer have all played the Cactus Club. A famous story went around when Nirvana played to around 10 people at the club, and merely months later they were on top of the charts. The Red Hot Chili Peppers were among the first bands to play Cactus Club, playing January 16, 1988 with their original line-up.

After closing in 2002, Cactus Club co-owner Craig Yamato opened a new nightclub in downtown San Jose called The Blank Club.
