= TPA Flight 028 =

Studio album by Tristan Psionic
- Released: 7 May 1996
- Recorded: 1996
- Genre: Indie rock
- Length: 43:03
- Label: Sonic Unyon

Tristan Psionic chronology
The Sounds of Tristan Psionic (1994)	TPA Flight 028 (1996)	Mind the Gap (2000)

Professional ratings
Review scores
Source	Rating
Allmusic	2.5/5 stars

TPA Flight 028 is the second album by Canadian indie rock group Tristan Psionic. It was released on vinyl and CD in 1996 on Sonic Unyon, a record label started by three members of the band. TPA is the IATA code of Tampa International Airport, but it more likely stands for the fictional "Tristan Psionic Airline."

The album held the number one position for Canadian college radio for eight weeks. It also reached the top thirty on the CMJ (Top 200) college radio albums chart.

== Track listing ==
All songs written by Tristan Psionic (Peter Kirkpatrick, Sandy McIntosh, Mark Milne, and Tim Potocic).

1. "Air Traffic Control" – 4:26
2. "Divided" – 4:24
3. "Lucky Star" – 3:13
4. "Professional Human" – 2:58
5. "Secret" – 4:53
6. "Puke" – 3:22
7. "All of the Important Things I've Done" – 4:00
8. "3 AM (Circa 1996)" – 3:01
9. "Trans Am Kid" – 2:45
10. "Zone of Compass Unreliability" – 2:59
11. "Donut Rock City" – 7:02
