= Formica Blues =

Studio album by Mono
- Released: 25 August 1997 (UK); 10 February 1998 (US); August 1998 (UK 2-disc)
- Recorded: Britannia Row, London; Strongroom, London
- Genres: Trip hop; electronica
- Length: 57:34
- Labels: Echo (UK); Mercury (US); Pony Canyon (Japan)
- Producers: Martin Virgo, Jim Abbiss

Formica Blues is the only album by English electronic duo Mono, released on 25 August 1997 by The Echo Label. Four singles were released from the album, of which the lead single, "Life in Mono", was the most successful. The album reached #71 in the UK album charts and remained on the chart for 1 week. In the United States, the album reached 137 on the Billboard 200 and remained on the chart for 7 weeks.

== Overview ==
Melody Maker summarizes the "basic formula" of the album as to wallow in the sound of television and film theme tunes of the Sixties and Seventies, but both to embellish and underpin it with jazzy breakbeats and Massive Attack synthy atmospheres". The use of harpsichord melody mirrors John Barry's film scores of the 1960s by design (and by sampling), though it has also been compared to themes for 1970s action adventure television shows such as The Protectors and The Zoo Gang.

"Slimcea Girl" took its title from Slimcea, a low-calorie bread sold in the UK during what has been reported as either the 1960s or the 1970s; the "girl" was one featured in the Slimcea TV ads, which featured a jingle inviting the viewer to be a "Slimcea girl". Another inspiration was Julie Christie's character in the film version of Billy Liar, whom Virgo described as a "liberated" "It girl", saying, "I just found it a powerful image". The song has been called "a cynical stare at the dreams and fantasies of those people who live behind the blinds [of Suburbia])"; musically, it has been described as reminiscent of Burt Bacharach, gospel music (in its use of backing vocals arranged like a choir), and "a Tamla torch song".

"The Outsider" is noted for a hammered dulcimer part, which Virgo had written on a synthesizer, imagined with a dulcimer sound; he subsequently called a dulcimer player (Geoff Smith) to play the part.

"High Life" has been compared to the music of 1960s girl groups like The Ronettes, whose production by Phil Spector is cited by Virgo as a style he wanted to incorporate and update.

"Hello Cleveland!", a complex instrumental, was titled after a line from This Is Spinal Tap. Virgo used the title ironically; taken from a stereotypical "rock and roll" context, it was then placed on a song that "wasn't very rock and roll". It is also the most musically esoteric song on the album; a paper in music journal Echo by Sara Nicholson, presented at the sixty-seventh annual meeting of the American Musicological Society, pinpoints a number of uncredited classical recordings sampled at certain points in the song. Primarily these are works by the three principal composers of the Second Viennese School, Arnold Schoenberg, Anton Webern, and Alban Berg; Virgo cites the school as among his musical influences. (Also see the Samples section.) The paper also analyzes the overall structure of the song: it opens with a guitar arpeggio followed by a solo piano composition (noted as being "strikingly similar to Erik Satie's Gnossienne#1 in f"), along with a 5/4 drum loop. About one minute into the song, the bulk of the samples are introduced by a one-second sample from the fifth movement of Luciano Berio's Sinfonia, which is repeated intermittently throughout this section. The beat stops in the last minute of the song, which returns to the piano motif, fading out.

The album cover and liner notes artwork, designed by an art student, consist of abstract collages incorporating photography of the surroundings of London.

== Recording and production ==
Vocals were recorded, alternately, on an AKG C12 and a Neumann U 87 microphone, depending on the vocal range desired; compression and equalization during the mixing process created a noticeably processed sound to the vocals.

Analog synthesizers were predominantly used over digital ones; those used by producer and engineer Jim Abbiss include a Roland Juno, a Minimoog, and a Sequential Pro One. Abbiss co-wrote "Playboys" with Virgo by manually programming synthesizers to generate various sounds that make up the song's extended techno sequences.

Live instruments in the recording studio were themselves sometimes used for samples. Many of the piano sounds on the album (particularly those on "Slimcea Girl") were multisampled from a Steinway at Abbey Road Studios, reportedly once used by The Beatles. Recording of "The Outsider" also ended up with Virgo multisampling the dulcimer brought to the studio.

== Critical reception ==
Professional ratings
Review scores
| Source | Rating |
|---|---|
| AllMusic | 4/5 stars |
| BAM | 4/5 stars |
| Entertainment Weekly | A− |
| Los Angeles Times | 3.5/4 stars |
| Muzik | 7/10 |
| NME | 7/10 |
| Pitchfork | 6.0/10 |
| Rolling Stone | 3/5 stars |
| Spin | 5/10 |
| Wall of Sound | 80/100 |

Melody Maker, in an overwhelmingly positive review, calls Formica Blues "unutterably gorgeous", praising it for evoking the era when "London was about to swing". The album was subsequently rated number 49 on the newspaper's top albums of the year list (Portishead's Portishead was rated number 18 on the same list).

The Melody Maker album review opened with the phrase "A case study in post-modern ennui", which became a theme in some analyses of the album. Nicholson, in interpreting "Hello Cleveland!", calls the song a pastiche of musical "quotations", comparable to Berio's Sinfonia in its referencing of past musical works. In addition, since the samples are not identified, Nicholson points out that, for the majority of listeners, they become simulacra — the postmodern concept developed by Jean Baudrillard, meaning imitations that can't be ascribed to an original object — referring to, in this case, the fact that most listeners, including professional reviewers, do not recognize them as being anything beyond generic compositions reminiscent of classical music. From the perspective of a listener familiar with the source material, however, Nicholson suggests that Virgo seems to even use the placement of the samples to parallel the musical references found in the original works.

Nevertheless, Nicholson concludes that the song "collapses", becoming an "aggregation of elements", which is applied to both groups of listeners: "amateur" listeners hear a collection of sounds with no particular significance, while "connoisseur" listeners are unable to construct a "narrative" out of the sounds as there are "too many elements". This effect, however, is tied back to Virgo's description of his musical influences, to suggest that it is exactly the "kaleidoscopic" effect of Phil Spector's Wall of Sound technique. Virgo, in his statements, in fact says that even though it "isn't music that tends to rear its head in a lot of popular music", the Klangfarbenmelodie (tone-colour-melody) approach to melody pioneered by the Second Viennese School was comparable to a style of popular music production "where there are so many things going on at once but the overall sound doesn't seem complicated" — which Virgo credits Phil Spector for originating; Nicholson makes the reasonable connection that this is referring to the Wall of Sound.

The Spanish radio program Viaje a los Sueños Polares (on Los 40 Principales) awarded the album Best International LP in its 1997 staff poll.

BBC broadcaster Mark Radcliffe listed Formica Blues among his top three albums of 1997, calling it "Atmospheric soundtracks for films that haven't been made yet" (prior to the 1998 release of Great Expectations).

=== Comparisons ===
The band's use of period film score-inspired music and breakbeats led to comparisons to the influential group Portishead, the first of what Allmusic calls "mid-'90s male instrumentalist/female singer duos".

== Track listing ==
Tracks 1, 3, 7, and 10 written by Martin Virgo; all others written by Virgo and Siobhan de Maré except 8 by Virgo, Jim Abbiss, and de Maré.

1. "Life in Mono" – 3:45
  - interlude – 0:18
2. "Silicone" – 4:14
  - interlude – 0:35
3. "Slimcea Girl" – 3:50
4. "The Outsider" – 5:08
5. "Disney Town" – 4:09
6. "The Blind Man" – 5:22
  - interlude – 1:18
7. "High Life" – 4:10
8. "Playboys" – 6:40
9. "Penguin Freud" – 6:18
10. "Hello Cleveland!" – 6:33

The instrumental interludes shown are in especially long pregaps between the numbered tracks on the CD.

=== US bonus track ===
11. "Life in Mono" (Alice Band mix)

=== Japan bonus tracks ===
11. "Life in Mono" ("Hope" mix)
12. "Silicone" (Winchester Club Space dub mix)
13. "Slimcea Girl" (Fat Boy vocal)

=== UK bonus disc ===
1. "Slimcea Girl" (The Aloof remix)
2. "Silicone" (Les Rythmes Digitales remix)
3. "Slimcea Girl" (Fat Boy vocal)
4. "High Life" (Next Century Short dub)
5. "Silicone" (Mr. Scruff remix)
6. "Life in Mono" (Propellerheads Sweat Band mix)
7. "Slimcea Girl" (Sol Brothers London dub remix)
8. "High Life" (187 Lockdown Low Life dub)
9. "Life in Mono" (Banana Republic Urban dub)
10. "High Life" (Natural Born Chillers vocal mix)

== Samples ==
- "Life in Mono": The Ipcress File, written and recorded by John Barry
- "Silicone": "Walk On By", written by Burt Bacharach and Hal David, recorded by Isaac Hayes; "Get Carter", written and recorded by Roy Budd
- "Slimcea Girl": "Viva Revolucion", written by Jon Carter, recorded by Artery
- "Penguin Freud": "Answered Prayers", written and recorded by David Sylvian; an interpolation of "The Pan Piper", written by Gil Evans

Uncredited samples in "Hello Cleveland!" consist of: Sinfonia by Luciano Berio; Six Pieces (Op. 6) by Anton Webern; Five Pieces for Orchestra (Op. 16) by Arnold Schoenberg; and Lulu Suite by Alban Berg. The sources sampled are found to be most likely recordings by Riccardo Chailly for Sinfonia and Simon Rattle for the three latter works — recordings all noted as being out-of-print.

== Personnel ==
=== Mono ===
- Siobhan de Maré – vocals, backing vocals (3, 4, 7)
- Martin Virgo – production, engineering (10), keyboards/programming, piano (3, 4, 7, 9, 10), guitars (5, 6, 7), bass (5, 7)

=== Other musicians involved ===
- Jim Abbiss – production (2, 5, 6, 8, 9), engineering (all but 7 and 10), keyboards/programming (6, 8), guitars (6), "wicked tambourine" (5)
- Mat Coleman – trombone (7)
- Luke Gifford – engineering (7, 9)
- Colin Graham – trumpet (7, 9)
- Mikey Hartwell – percussion (7)
- Lee Hubbard (Bushmaster) – drum programming (6)
- The Lauren Hughes Experience – triangle (10)
- Chris Margary – saxophone (7)
- Martin McColl – guitar (2, 9)
- Paul Motion – engineering (7)
- Bernard O'Neil – double bass (2)
- Paulo de Oliveira – vocals (9)
- Geoff Smith – hammered dulcimer (4)
- James Thorp – guitar (7)

== Singles ==
Each single was released in 12" and CD formats, and included a number of remixes distributed across the various formats.

=== "Life in Mono" ===
Released: November 1996, April 1998

- Radio edit
- Alice Band mix
- Sweat Band mix
- "Hope" mix
- Bushmaster
- Instrumental
- Banana Republic Urban dub
- Banana Republic Shift Control mix
- Mr. Natural vocal mix
- LHOOQ Ingenue mix

=== "Silicone" ===
Released: May 1997

- Les Rythmes Digitales remix
- Mr. Scruff mix
- Winchester Club Space dub mix
- L.H.B. Implant

=== "Slimcea Girl" ===
Released: October 1997

- Aloof remix
- Aloof dub reprise
- The Fat Boy vocal
- The Fat Boy dub
- Sol Brothers London dub remix
- Sol Brothers London bass mix
- The Danmass remix
- Fuzzed

=== "High Life" ===
Released: 29 June 1998

- 7" mix
- 187 Lockdown Low Life dub
- 187 Lockdown Low Life instrumental
- Remember Herbert's mix
- Lowfinger's Stereo Low Life mix
- Natural Born Chillers vocal mix
- Natural Born Chillers dub mix
- Next Century Long dub mix
- Next Century Short dub mix

== Music videos ==
The music video for "Life in Mono" was directed by Chuck Leal and Matt Donaldson, and first aired in February 1998. Filmed in New York City (with the Manhattan Bridge and the Brooklyn Bridge prominently shown in some scenes), most of the video consists of de Maré performing the song alone in nondescript urban areas, with Virgo appearing in only a few shots, not doing anything in particular. Another version, interspersed with clips from Great Expectations, was used to promote the song as part of the film's soundtrack.

The video for "Silicone" was directed by Nick Abrahams and Michael Tomkins (working as "Nick and Mikey") for the production company Trash 2000. It was filmed at Heston Service Station Motel, located along Britain's M4 motorway. Filmed in black and white, it depicts hotel rooms and corridors populated by the band members as well as a "Neolithic man" dressed in a rabbit costume, and men in suits with a giant potato or a sculpted chimpanzee face in place of their heads.

The video for "Slimcea Girl" was directed by Alexander Hemming.

The video for "High Life" was directed by Malcolm Venville, who also photographed the single covers of "High Life" and the 1998 release of "Life in Mono".

During a May 1998 online chat the band revealed plans to film a video with David LaChapelle, though there is no sign that this was ever realized.
