= Come from Heaven =

Studio album by Alpha
- Released: 1997
- Genre: Trip hop, downtempo
- Length: 68:46
- Label: Melankolic, Virgin
- Producer: Alpha

Alpha chronology
Come from Heaven (1997)	Pepper: Remixes & Rarities (1998)

Singles from Come from Heaven
- 1. "Sometime Later" Released: 1997; 2. "Slim" Released: 1998

Come from Heaven is the debut studio album by Alpha. It was released on Massive Attack's record label, Melankolic, in 1997. It includes vocal contributions from Martin Barnard, Wendy Stubbs, and Helen White. "Sometime Later" peaked at number 91 on the UK Singles Chart.

== Critical reception ==
Professional ratings
Review scores
Source	Rating
AllMusic	3/5 stars
Entertainment Weekly	B+
NME	7/10
Pitchfork	7.1/10
Spin	8/10

Ned Raggett of AllMusic described the album as "a gently queasy blend of sounds and styles that manages to be tasteful and downright romantic without being airbrushed soul." He wrote: "When the duo fully stretches its collage/sampling muscles, as on the title track, it can be quite breathtaking, a careful balance between chaos and atmospherics."

Larry Flick of Billboard stated that the album "combines the sample-happy experimental sound of the electronic underground with traditional pop sounds." Randall Roberts of CMJ New Music Monthly called it "slow, deep, sexy nighttime music, so richly recorded and alive with pleasure that only the extremely sexually repressed could not feel it down there."

== Track listing ==
No.	Title	Writer(s)	Length
1.	"My Things"	Dingley, Jenks	4:09
2.	"Rain"	Dingley, Jenks, Stubbs	5:07
3.	"Sometime Later"	Dingley, Jenks, Barnard	7:01
4.	"Delaney"	Dingley, Jenks, Barnard, White	4:55
5.	"Hazeldub"	Dingley, Jenks	5:46
6.	"Slim"	Dingley, Jenks, White	5:51
7.	"Come from Heaven"	Dingley, Jenks	2:14
8.	"Back"	Dingley, Jenks, Barnard	5:02
9.	"Nyquil"	Dingley, Jenks, Stubbs	6:55
10.	"Apple Orange"	Dingley, Jenks	6:11
11.	"With"	Dingley, Jenks, White	3:31
12.	"Firefly"	Dingley, Jenks, Barnard	4:46
13.	"Somewhere Not Here"	Dingley, Jenks, Stubbs	7:18

Samples

- "The April Fools" by Percy Faith on My Things
- "What the World Needs Now Is Love" by Burt Bacharach on Rain
- "My Autumn's Done Come" (uncredited) by Lee Hazlewood on Sometime Later and Somewhere Not Here
- "Delaney Takes a Break" by Michel Legrand on Delaney
- "Not the Lovin' Kind" by Lee Hazlewood and "Who Needs Forever" by Astrud Gilberto (both uncredited) on Hazeldub
- "Plus Fort Que Nous" by Francis Lai and "Summertime" by Memphis Slim on Slim
- "A House Is Not a Home" by Ronnie Carroll and "The Ghost's Leavetaking" by Sylvia Plath on Back
- "The Hour of Enchantment" by Ron Moody and "The Windmills of Your Mind" by Dusty Springfield on Nyquil
- "Courtyard" by Bobbie Gentry on With
- "Save the Sunlight" by Herb Alpert and Lani Hall on Firefly

== Personnel ==
Credits adapted from liner notes.

- Corin Dingley – production, photography
- Andy Jenks – production, photography
- Wendy Stubbs – vocals (2, 9, 13)
- Martin Barnard – vocals (3, 4, 8, 12)
- Helen White – vocals (4, 6, 11)
- Donald Skinner – instrumentation on additional loops
- Alex Lee – instrumentation on additional loops
- Angelo Bruschini – instrumentation on additional loops
- Daniel Jones – strings score
- Gavin Wright – strings conducting
- Paul Hicks – strings overdub engineering
- Alex Scannell – strings overdub engineering assistance
- Andy Bradfield – mixing
- Ben Findlay – mixing assistance, additional overdub engineering
- Jacquie Turner – mixing assistance, additional overdub engineering
- Russell Kearney – mixing assistance, additional overdub engineering
- Marco Migliari – mixing assistance
- Justin Griffith – mixing assistance
- Emma Jones – mixing assistance
- Kevin Metcalfe – mastering
- Stephen Male – art direction
- Latifah Cornelius – design
- Jack Webb – photography
- Donald Christie – photography
