= Life in Mono =

Single by Mono

from the album Formica Blues
- Released: 28 October 1996
- Genre: Trip hop
- Length: 3:45
- Label: Echo
- Songwriters: John Barry, Martin Virgo
- Producers: Martin Virgo, Jim Abbiss

Mono singles chronology
"Life in Mono" (1996)	"Silicone" (1997)

"Life in Mono" is a song by English electronic duo Mono from their debut studio album, Formica Blues (1997). It was released on 28 October 1996 by The Echo Label as the first single from the album.

== Background ==
The song was used as the theme to the 1998 version of the movie Great Expectations (reportedly chosen by actor Robert De Niro), appearing in the Daria episode "Monster", as well as being used for the launch television advert for the new Rover 25. It was covered by Emma Bunton in 2006 for her third album, also titled Life in Mono.

The chorus consists of "ingenue, I just don't know what to do" repeated; the word was a late addition in songwriting, to rhyme with "I just don't know what to do".

== Reception ==
Billboard called the song's usage in Great Expectations an example of film music that "works", citing its "anguished" lyrics as complementary to Ethan Hawke's character's predicaments, and comparing de Maré's voice to those of Roberta Flack and Billie Holiday.

In the US, Mercury Records marketed the single in a campaign aimed to "build awareness at both the radio and club levels", shipping promotional singles to radio stations on 10 February, and to nightclubs at about the same time. The single's sales only allowed it to chart in the lower echelons of the Billboard Hot 100, peaking at number 70 (though it did reach at least 19 on the Top Heatseekers chart), but radio airplay and requests allowed it to reach 28 on the Modern Rock Tracks chart.

"Life In Mono" reached No 60 in the band's native United Kingdom.

== Charts ==
Chart performance for "Life in Mono"
Chart (1998)	Peak position
Australia (ARIA)	83
UK Singles (Official Charts)	60
US Billboard Hot 100	70
US Alternative Airplay (Billboard)	28

== Release history ==
Release dates and formats for "Life in Mono"
Region	Date	Format(s)	Label(s)	Ref.
United Kingdom	28 October 1996	12-inch vinyl; CD; cassette	Echo	
United States	10 February 1998	Radio	Mercury	
United States	24 March 1998	Contemporary hit radio	Echo; Mercury	
United Kingdom (re-release)	20 April 1998	12-inch vinyl; CD	Echo	
