= Alpha (band) =

English post-trip hop group

- Origin: Bristol, England
- Genre: Trip hop
- Years active: 1996–present
- Labels: Don't Touch Recordings, Melankolic
- Members: Corin Dingley; Wendy Stubbs; Hannah Collins
- Past members: Andy Jenks; Martin Barnard; Helen White; Peter Wild
- Website: www.alphaheaven.com

Alpha is an English post-trip hop group. It comprises founding member Corin Dingley, vocalist and lyricist Wendy Stubbs and Hannah Collins; other founding member, Andy Jenks, left the group before the release of their 2007 album, The Sky Is Mine.

Originally working under the name "Ariel", the duo of Dingley and Jenks came together in 1995 after both had worked on various projects in the Bristol area, home of trip hop groups Massive Attack and Portishead.

Like Massive Attack, Alpha recruited singers to add vocals to their downtempo, beat-driven compositions of the late 1990s, which led to them being included in the category of "post trip hop".

Their debut album, Come from Heaven, was the first release on Massive Attack's Melankolic label in 1997. They are currently on Don't Touch Recordings, a label they founded.

A collaboration with reggae vocalist Horace Andy, entitled Two Phazed People, was released in 2009.

Corin Dingley, one of the founding members of Alpha, continues to release music such as Lockdown (2020) and Loving Nobody(2015) that features vocals from Joe Cassidy (Butterfly Child), Hannah Collins, Jamie Gingell (Secret Shine), Kate Stables (This Is the Kit), Wendy Stubbs and Jesse D Vernon (Morning Star).

== Discography ==
Studio albums

- Come from Heaven (1997)
- The Impossible Thrill (2001)
- Stargazing (2003)
- Made in Space (2003)
- Lost in a Garden of Clouds: Part 1 (2004)
- Lost in a Garden of Clouds: Part 2 (2006)
- The Sky Is Mine (2007)
- Two Phazed People (2009) (with Horace Andy)
- Eleventh Trip (2012)
- Loving Nobody (2015)
- Failure (2021)
- Dust (2022)
- Phoenix (2024)
- Calling to the Sun (2025)
- Dear Darkness (2026)

Compilations albums

- Pepper: Remixes & Rarities (1998)
- Without Some Help (2006)

EPs

- South (2001)
- Revolution (2002)
- Ariel (2009)
- L'hiver (2012)
- Salt (2015)
- Sounds of the Cosmos (2020)
- Lockdown (2020)

Singles

- "Sometime Later" (1997)
- "Slim" (1998)
